The following list of Indian monarchs is one of several lists of incumbents.  It includes those said to have ruled a portion of the Indian subcontinent, including Sri Lanka.

The earliest Indian rulers are known from epigraphical sources found in archeological inscriptions on Ashokan edicts written in Pali language and using brahmi script. They are also known from the literary sources like Sanskrit literature, Jain literature and Buddhist literature in context of literary sources. Archaeological sources include archeological remains in Indian subcontinent which give many details about earlier kingdoms, monarchs, and their interactions with each other.

Early types of historic documentation include metal coins with an indication of the ruler, or at least the dynasty, at the time. These Punch-marked coins were issued around 600s BCE and are found in abundance from the Maurya Empire in 300s BCE.

There are also stone inscriptions and documentary records from foreign cultures from around this time. The main imperial or quasi-imperial rulers of North India are fairly clear from this point on, but many local rulers, and the situation in the Deccan and South India has less clear stone inscriptions from early centuries. Main sources of South Indian history is Sangam Literature dated from 600s BCE. Time period of ancient Indian rulers is speculative, or at least uncertain.

Heheya Kingdom 

 Maharaja Pururusu
 Maharaj Ayusu
 Maharaj Nahusha
 Maharaj Yayati
 Maharaj Yadu
 Maharaj Sahasrajit
 Maharaj Shatjit
 Maharaj Haihay –  (Founder of Heheya Kingdom)
 Maharaj Dharma
 Maharaj Dharmnetra
 Maharaj Kuntiraj
 Maharaj Sahjit
 Maharaj Mahishman – (Founder of Mahismati)
 Maharaj Bhadrasen
 Maharaj Durdabh
 Maharaj Dhhannaka
 Kritvirya
 Maharaj Sahasrarjun
 Maharaj Veersen (Jaydwaj)

Later they were divided among different sub-castes which include Kansara, Kasera, Tamrakar, Thathera, Tambat and many more.

Medieval Haihayas 
A number of early medieval dynasties, which include the Kalachuri and Mushika Kingdom of Kerala, claimed their descent from the Haihayas.

Magadha dynasties

Magadha dynasty 

-

(Uparichara Vasu was father of Brihadratha, he was succeeded by his son Brihadratha on throne of Magadha)

(Uparichara Vasu descendants founded many kingdoms like King Pratyagraha of Chedi Kingdom and great-grandfather of Shishupala, King Vatsa of Vatsa Kingdom and King Matsya of Matsya Kingdom and great-grandfather of Virata and Satyavati)

Brihadratha dynasty (c. 1700 – 682 BCE) 

Rulers -

(Ripunjaya was the last ruler of dynasty, dethorned by Pradyota in 682 BCE)

Pradyota dynasty (c. 682 – 544 BCE) 

Rulers-

(Varttivarddhana was last ruler of dynasty dethroned by Bimbisara in 544 BCE)

Haryanka dynasty (c. 544 – 413 BCE) 

Rulers-

(Nāgadāsaka was last ruler of dynasty overthrowed by Shishunaga in 413 BCE)

Shishunaga dynasty (c. 413 – 345 BCE) 

Rulers-

(Mahanandin lost his empire by his illegitimate son Mahapadma Nanda in 345 BCE)

Nanda Empire (c. 345 – 322 BCE) 

Rulers-

(Dhana Nanda lost his empire to Chandragupta Maurya after being defeated by him in 322 BCE)

Maurya Empire (c. 322 – 184 BCE) 

Rulers-

(Brihadratha was the last ruler of dynasty, dethroned by Pushyamitra Shunga  in 185 BCE)

Shunga Empire (c. 185 – 73 BCE) 

Rulers-

(Devabhuti was the last ruler of dynasty dethroned by Vasudeva Kanva in 73 BCE)

Kanva dynasty (c. 73 – 28 BCE) 

Rulers-

(Susarman was the last ruler of dynasty, dethroned by Simuka of Satavahana Empire)

Gonanda dynasty of Kashmir

Gonanda dynasty I 

Kalhana mentions that Gonanda I ascended the throne in 653 Kali calendar era. Dating of Gonanda kings based on calculation of Jogesh Chander Dutt.

Gonanditya dynasty (c. 1175 – 167 BCE) 

The Gonanditya dynasty ruled Kashmir for 1002 years.

Pratapaditya's dynasty (c. 167 BCE – 25 CE) 

No kings mentioned in this book have been traced in any other historical source. These kings ruled Kashmir for 192 years.

Gonanda dynasty II (c. 25 – 345 CE)

Gandhara Kingdom (c. 1500 – 518 BCE) 

Gandhara region centered around the Peshawar Valley and Swat river valley, though the cultural influence of "Greater Gandhara" extended across the Indus river to the Taxila region in Potohar Plateau and westwards into the Kabul and Bamiyan valleys in Afghanistan, and northwards up to the Karakoram range.

Known Gandhara rulers are-
 Nagnajit
 Subala
 Shakuni
 Achala
 Kalikeya
 Suvala
 Vrishaka
 Vrihadvala
 Gaya
 Gavaksha
 Vrishava
 Charmavat
 Arjava
 Suka
 Kulinda
 Pushkarasakti (c. 535–518 BCE), last ruler of Gandhara kingdom probably at time of Achaemenid conquest of the Indus Valley
 Kandik, (late ruler)

Kuru Kingdom (c. 1200 – 345 BCE)

Kuru II was the ruler of 
Puru dynasty after whom the dynasty was named Kuruvāmshā and the kingdom was renamed from Puru dynasty to Kuru Kingdom. He had three sons, namely Vidhuratha I who became the ruler of Pratisthana, Vyushitaswa who died at a very young age, and Sudhanva, who became the ruler of Magadha. So Vidhuratha I became the king of Hastinapura.

List of rulers–
 Kuru II 
 Vidhuratha I
 Jahnu
 Parikshit II
 Janamejaya II
 Bheemasena
 Prathishravas
 Pratipa
 Shantanu, (Bhishma was the youngest son of Shantanu and Ganga. Chitrāngada and Vichitravirya were the sons of Shantanu and Satyavati.)
 Vichitravirya, (Dhritarashtra, Pandu and Vidura were the sons of Vichitravirya)
 Pandu
 Dhritarashtra, (The Pandava were the five sons of Pandu and Kunti whereas the Kaurava were the hundred sons of Dhritarashtra and Gandhari.)
 Yudhishthira, (Yaudheya was the son of Yudhishthira and Devika. Ghatotkacha was the son of Bhima and Hidimbi, Abhimanyu was the son of Arjuna and Subhadra. Babruvahana was the son of Arjuna and Chitrāngadā. Iravan was the son of Arjuna and Ulupi. Niramitra was the son of Nakula and Karenumati. Suhotra was the son of Sahadeva and Queen Vijaya. Upapandava were the 5 sons of Pandava and Draupadi)
 Parikshit, (was the son of Abhimanyu.)
 Janamejaya
 Satanika
 Ashwamedhatta
 Dwiteeyram
 Chatramal
 Chitrarath
 Dushtshailya
 Ugrasena
 Shoorsen 
 Bhuvanpati
 Ranjeet
 Rikchak
 Sukdeva
 Narharidev
 Suchirath
 Shoorsen II
 Parvatsen
 Mehavi
 Soncheer
 Bheemdev
 Nriharidev
 Pooranmal
 Kardavi
 Alammik
 Udaipal
 Duvanmal
 Damat
 Bheempal
 Kshemaka

Kshemaka was the last Kuru king dethroned by Mahapadma Nanda of Nanda Empire in 345 BCE.

Kosala Kingdom (c. 1100 – 345 BCE) 

List of rulers–

 Brihadbala
 Brihatkshaya
 Urukriya
 Vatsavyuha
 Prativyoma
 Bhaanu
 Divakara
 Veer Sahadeva
 Brihadashva
 Bhanuratha
 Pratitashva
 Supratika
 Marudeva
 Sunakshatra
 Pushkara
 Antariksha
 Suvarna
 Bruhadaraaj
 Kritanjaya
 Ranajjaya
 Sanjaya Mahakoshala or Jayasena
 Prasenajit
 Virudhaka
 Sumitra

Sumitra was the last ruler of Kosala kingdom, who was defeated by the Nanda ruler emperor Mahapadma Nanda of Magadha in 340 BCE. However, he wasn't killed, and fled to Rohtas, located in present-day Bihar.

Videha dynasty of Mithila (c. 1100 – 700 BCE) 

There were 52 Janaka (kings) ruled Videha dynasty of Mithila-

 Mithi - (founder of Mithila and the first Janaka)
 Udavasu
 Nandivardhana
 Suketu
 Devarata
 Brihadvrata
 Mahavira
 Sudhriti
 Dristaketu
 Haryasva
 Maru
 Pratindhaka
 Kritiratha
 Devamidha
 Vibhuta
 Mahidhrata
 Kirtirata
 Mahorama
 Swarnorama
 Hrisvaroma
 Seeradhwaja
 Bhaanumaan
 Shatadyumn
 Shuchi
 Oorjnaamaa
 Kriti
 Anjan
 Kurujit
 Arishtnemi
 Shrutaayu
 Supaarshwa
 Srinjaya
 Kshemaavee
 Anenaa
 Bhaumarath
 Satyarath
 Upagu
 Upagupt
 Swaagat
 Swaanand
 Suvarchaa
 Supaarshwa
 Subhaash
 Sushrut
 Jaya
 Vijaya
 Rit
 Sunaya
 Veetahavya
 Dhriti
 Bahulaashwa
 Kriti - last King of Videha or Janaka dynasty, Kirti Janak was atrocious ruler who lost control over his subjects. He was dethroned by public under leadership of Acharyas (Learned Men).

During this period of fall of Videha dynasty, the famous republic of Licchavi was rising in Vaishali and Mithila region came under control of Licchavi clan of Vajji confederacy in around eight century BCE.

Panchala Kingdom (c. 1100 BCE – 350 CE) 

Ajamida II had a son named Rishin. Rishin had two sons namely Samvarana II, whose son was Kuru and Brihadvasu whose descendants were Panchalas.

List of Panchala Kingdom rulers are-

 Rishin
 Brihadbhanu, (son of Brihadvasu)
 Brihatkaya
 Puranjaya
 Riksha
 Bramhyaswa
 Aramyaswa
 Mudgala, Yavinara, Pratiswan, Maharaja Kampilya - (founder of Kampilya capital of Panchala Kingdom)
 Sranjaya, (son of Aramyaswa)
 Dritimana
 Drdhanemi
 Sarvasena, (founder of Ujjain Kingdom)
 Mitra
 Rukmaratha
 Suparswa
 Sumathi
 Sannatimana
 Krta
 Pijavana
 Somadutta
 Jantuvahana
 Badhrayaswa
 Brihadhishu
 Brihadhanu
 Brihadkarma
 Jayaratha 
 Visvajit
 Seinyajit
 Nepavirya, (after this King's name the country was named Nepaldesh)
 Samara
 Sadashva
 Ruchiraswa
 Pruthusena
 Prapti
 Prthaswa
 Sukrthi
 Vibhiraja
 Anuha
 Bramhadatta II
 Vishwaksena
 Dandasena
 Durmukha
 Durbuddhi
 Dharbhya
 Divodasa
 Sivana I
 Mitrayu
 Maitrayana
 Soma
 Sivana II
 Sadasana
 Sahadeva
 Somaka, (Somaka's eldest son was Sugandakrthu and youngest was Prishata. But in a war all sons died and Prishata Survived and became the king of Panchala)
 Prishati, (son of Somaka) 
 Drupada, (son of Prishata)
 Dhrishtadyumna, (was the son of Drupada, Draupadi and Shikhandi were the daughters of Drupada)
 Keśin Dālbhya
 Pravahana Jaivali
 Achyuta, (last known ruler of Panchala Kingdom which was defeated in c. 350 CE by Gupta ruler Samudragupta.)

Anga Kingdom (c. 1100 – 530 BCE) 

Known Anga rulers are-

 Maharaj Anga - (founder of the kingdom and son of King Bali)
 Romapada
 Brihadratha
 Angaraj Karna
 Vrishaketu - (son of Karna)
 Tamralipta 
 Lomapada
 Chitraratha
 Vrihadratha
 Vasuhoma
 Dhatarattha
 Dhadivahana
 Brahmadatta - (last king of Anga kingdom)

Kalinga Kingdom (c. 1100 – 261 BCE)

Kalinga dynasty (I) (c. 1100 – 700 BCE) 

According to Mahabharata and some Puranas, the prince 'Kalinga' founded the Kalinga Kingdom, in the current day region of coastal Odisha, including the North Sircars. The Mahabharata also mentions one 'Srutayudha' as the king of the Kalinga kingdom, who joined the Kaurava camp. In the Buddhist text, Mahagovinda Suttanta, Kalinga and its ruler, 'Sattabhu', have been mentioned.
Known rulers are-
 King Kalinga, (founder of Kalinga Kingdom)
 King Odra, (founder of Odra Kingdom)
 Srutayudha
 Srutayush
 Manimat
 Chitrangada
 Subahu
 Virasena
 Sudatta
 Nalikira
 Yavanaraj
 Dantavakkha or Dantavakhra (c. 9th century BCE)
 Avakinnayo Karakandu (c. late 9th to early 8th century BCE)
 Vasupala (c. 8th century BCE)

Kalinga dynasty (II) (c. 700 – 350 BCE) 

This dynasty is mentioned in Chullakalinga Jataka and Kalingabodhi Jataka. The last ruler of First Kalinga dynasty is said to have broken away from the Danda kingdom along with the kings of Asmaka and Vidarbha as its feudal states, and established rule of Second Kalinga dynasty.
Known rulers are-
 Dandaki
 Mahakalinga
 Chullakalinga
 Kalinga II (c. 7th – 6th century BCE)

Other or late Kalinga rulers according to Dāṭhavaṃsa are-

This was probably another dynasty or late rulers of Second Kalinga dynasty, which is mentioned in Dāṭhavaṃsa.
Known rulers are-
 Brahmadatta (c. 6th – 5th century BCE)
 Sattabhu
 Kasiraja
 Sunanda
 Guhasiva

Suryavamsha of Kalinga (c. 350 – 261 BCE) 
Known rulers are-
 Brahmaadittiya (c. 4th century BCE)
His son, prince 'Soorudasaruna-Adeettiya' was exiled and as per Maldivian history, established the first kingdom Dheeva Maari and laid the foundation of the Adeetta dynasty.
Unknown rulers
 Maha Padmanabha (until 261 BCE), ruler of Kalinga at time of Mauryan annexation of Kalinga.

After Kalinga War (261 BCE), Kalinga Kingdom became a part of Mauryan Empire, after which Kalinga Kingdom was succeeded by [[Mahameghavahana dynasty
|Mahameghavahana Empire]] between 230 and 190 BCE which ruled until 350 CE.

Kamboja Kingdom (c. 700 – 200 BCE) 

Known Kamboja rulers are-
 Kamatha
 Chandravarma Kamboja
 Kamatha Kamboja
 Prapaksha Kamboja
 Sudakshina Kamboja
 Srindra Varmana Kamboj

Shakya Republic of Kapilavastu (c. 7th to 5th century BCE) 

Known Shakya rulers are–

 Shakya
 Sihahanu
 Śuddhodana
 Siddhartha Shakya (aka Gautama Buddha)
 Rāhula

Later Shakya Republic was conquered by Virudhaka of Kosala.

Pandyan dynasty (c. 600 BCE – 1650 CE)

Early Pandyans

 Koon Pandiyan - (Earliest Known Pandyan king)
 Nedunj Cheliyan I (Aariyap Padai Kadantha Nedunj Cheliyan), he was mentioned in legend of Kannagi
 Pudappandiyan
 Mudukudumi Paruvaludhi
 Nedunj Cheliyan II (Pasumpun Pandiyan)
 Nan Maran
 Nedunj Cheliyan III (Talaiyaalanganathu Seruvendra Nedunj Cheliyan)
 Maran Valudi
 Musiri Mutriya Cheliyan
 Ukkirap Peruvaluthi

Middle Pandyans (c. 590–920 CE)

 Kadungon (590–620 CE)
 Maravarman Avani Culamani (c. 620–645 CE)
 Jayantavarman (c. 645–670 CE)
 Arikesari Maravarman Nindraseer Nedumaaran (c. 670–710 CE)
 Kochadaiyan Ranadhiran (710–735 CE)
 Arikesari Parankusa Maravarman Rajasimha I (735–765)
 Parantaka Nedunjadaiyan (765–815)
 Rasasingan II (790–800)
 Varagunan I (800–830)
 Srimara Srivallabha (815–862) 
 Varagunavarman II (862–880)
 Parantaka Viranarayana (880–900)
 Maravarman Rajasimha II (900–920)

Pandyans under Chola Empire (c. 920–1216 CE)

Sundara Pandyan I
Vira Pandyan I
Vira Pandyan II
Amarabhujanga Tivrakopa
Jatavarman Sundara Chola Pandyan
Maravarman Vikrama Chola Pandyan
Maravarman Parakrama Chola Pandyan
Jatavarman Chola Pandya
Seervallabha Manakulachala (1101–1124)
Maaravaramban Seervallaban (1132–1161)
Parakrama Pandyan I (1161–1162)
Kulasekara Pandyan III
Vira Pandyan III
Jatavarman Srivallaban (1175–1180)
Jatavarman Kulasekaran I (1190–1216)

Pandalam (Later Pandyans) (c. 1212–1345 CE)
Parakrama Pandyan II (1212–1215) 
Maravarman Sundara Pandyan (1216–1238)
Sadayavarman Kulasekaran II (1238–1240)
Maravarman Sundara Pandyan II (1238–1251)
Jatavarman Sundara Pandyan (1251–1268)
Maaravarman Kulasekara Pandyan I (1268–1308)
Sundara Pandyan IV (1309–1327)
Vira Pandyan IV (1309–1345)

Tenkasi Pandyans (c. 1422–1650 CE)
During the 15th century, the Pandyans lost their traditional capital city Madurai because of the Islamic and Nayaks invasion, and were forced to move their capital to Tirunelveli in southern Tamilakam and existed there as vassals.

 Cataiyavarman Parakrama Pandyan (1422–1463)
 Cataiyavarman III Kulasekara Pandyan (1429–1473)
 Azhagan Perumal Parakrama Pandyan (1473–1506)
 Kulasekara Pandyan (1479–1499)
 Cataiyavarman Civallappa Pandyan (1534–1543)
 Parakrama Kulasekara Pandyan (1543–1552)
 Nelveli Maran (1552–1564)
 Cataiyavarman Adiveerama Pandyan (1564–1604)
 Varathunga Pandyan (1588–1612)
 Varakunarama Pandyan (1613–1618)
 Kollankondan (1618–1650)

Chera dynasty (c. 600 BCE–1530 CE)

Ancient Chera (c. 600 BCE–400 CE)

Vanavan or Vanavaramban (425–350 BCE) 
Kuttuvan Uthiyan Cheralathan (350–328 BCE)
Imayavaramban Neduncheralathan (328–270 BCE)
Palyaanai Chelkezhu Kuttuvan (270–245 BCE)
Kalangaikanni narmudicheral (245–220 BCE)
Perumcheralathan (220–200 BCE)
Kudakko Neduncheralathan (200–180 BCE)
Kadal Pirakottiya Velkezhu kuttuvan (180–125 BCE)
Adukotpattuch Cheralathan (125–87 BCE)
Selvak kadungo Vazhiyathan (87–62 BCE)
Yanaikatchei Mantharanj Cheral Irumborai (62–42 BCE)
Thagadoor Erintha Perum Cheral Irumborai (42–25 BCE), (unification of Upper and lower Kongu Nadu).
Ilancheral Irumborai (25–19 BCE)
Karuvur Eriya Koperumcheral Irumborai (19–1 BCE)
Vanji Mutrathu tunjiya Anthuvancheral (1 BCE–10 CE)
Kanaikal Irumborai (20–30 CE)
Palai Padiya Perum kadngko (1–30 CE)
Kokothai Marban (30–61 CE)
Cheran Chenguttuvan (61–140 CE)
Kottambalathu tunjiya Maakothai (140–150 CE)
Cheraman mudangi kidantha Nedumcheralathan (150–160 CE)
Cheraman Kanaikkal Irumborai (160–180 CE)
Cheraman Ilamkuttuvan (180–200 CE)
Thambi Kuttuvan (200–220 CE)
Poorikko (220–250 CE)
Cheraman Kuttuvan Kothai (250–270 CE)
Cheraman Vanjan (270–300 CE)
Mantharanj Cheral (330–380 CE), found in Allahabad Pillar of Samudragupta.

Kongu Cheras (Karur) (c. 400–844 CE)

 Ravi Kotha
 Kantan Ravi
 Vira Kotha
 Vira Narayana
 Vira Chola
 Vira Kerala
 Amara Bhujanga Deva
 Kerala Kesari Adhirajaraja Deva

Kodungallur Cheras (c. 844–1122 CE)
(The Perumals, formerly Kulasekharas)

 Sthanu Ravi Kulasekhara (844–870 CE)
 Kulasekhara Alvar/Kulasekhara Varma
Rama Rajasekhara (870–883 CE)
 Cheraman Perumal Nayanar
Vijayaraga (883–895 CE)
 Kotha Kotha Kerala Kesari (895–905 CE)
Kotha Ravi (905–943 CE)
 Indu Kotha (943–962 CE)
 Bhaskara Ravi Manukuladithya (962–1021 CE)
 Ravi Kotha Rajasimha (1021–1036 CE)
 Raja Raja (1036–1089 CE)
 Ravi Rama Rajadithya (1036–1089 CE)
 Adithyan Kotha Ranadithya (1036–1089 CE)
 Rama Kulasekhara (1089–1122 CE)

Venadu Cheras (Kulasekhara) (c. 1090–1530 CE)

Rama Kulasekhara (1090–1102)
 Kotha Varma Marthandam (1102–1125)
 Vira Kerala Varma I (1125–1145)
 Kodai Kerala Varma (1145–1150)
 Vira Ravi Varma (1145–1150)
 Vira Kerala Varma II (1164–1167)
 Vira Aditya Varma (1167–1173)
 Vira Udaya Martanda Varma (1173–1192)
 Devadaram Vira Kerala Varma III (1192–1195)
 Vira Manikantha Rama Varma Tiruvadi (1195- ?)
 Vira Rama Kerala Varma Tiruvadi (1209–1214)
 Vira Ravi Kerala Varma Tiruvadi (1214–1240)
 Vira Padmanabha Martanda Varma Tiruvadi (1240–1252)
 Ravi Varma (1252–1313)
 Vira Udaya Martanda Varma (1313–1333)
 Aditya Varma Tiruvadi (1333–1335)
 Vira Rama Udaya Martanda Varma Tiruvadi (1335–1342)
 Vira Kerala Varma Tiruvadi (1342–1363)
 Vira Martanda Varma III (1363–1366)
 Vira Rama Martanda Varma (1366–1382)
 Vira Ravi Varma (1383–1416)
 Vira Ravi Ravi Varma (1416–1417)
 Vira Kerala Martanda Varma (1383)
 Chera Udaya Martanda Varma (1383–1444)
 Vira Ravi Varma (1444–1458)
 Sankhara Sri Vira Rama Martanda Varma (1458–1468)
 Vira Kodai Sri Aditya Varma (1468–1484
 Vira Ravi Ravi Varma (1484–1503)
 Martanda Varma, Kulasekhara Perumal (1503–1504)
 Vira Ravi Kerala Varma, Kulasekhara Perumal (1504–1530)

Chola dynasty (c. 600 BCE – 1279 CE)

Ancient Chola rulers (c. 600 BCE – 300 CE) 

 Eri Oliyan Vaendhi
 Maandhuvaazhi
 El Mei Nannan
 Keezhai Kinjuvan
 Vazhisai Nannan 
 Mei Kiyagusi Aerru
 Aai Kuzhi Agusi Aerru
 Thizhagan Maandhi
 Maandhi Vaelan
 Aai Adumban
 Ilamcetcenni
 Karikala Chola
 Nedunkilli
 Nalankilli
 Killivalavan
 Perunarkilli
 Kocengannan

Chola Empire rulers (c. 848 – 1279 CE)

Kingdom of Tambapanni (c. 543–437 BCE)

House of Vijaya

Satavahana dynasty (c. 228 BCE – 224 CE) 

The beginning of the Satavahana rule is dated variously between 230 BCE to 100 BCE and lasted until the early 3rd century CE. Satavahanas dominated the Deccan region from 1st century BCE to 3rd century CE. The following Satavahana kings are historically attested by epigraphic records, although the Puranas name several more kings.

S. Nagaraju relies on the Puranic lists of 30 kings, and gives the following regnal dates:

Mahameghavahana dynasty (c. 225 BCE – 300 CE)

Mahamegha Vahana was the founder of the Kalingan Chedi or Cheti Dynasty. The names of Sobhanaraja, Chandraja, Ksemaraja also appear in context. But, Kharavela is the most well known among them. The exact relation between Mahamegha Vahana and Kharavela is not known.

Maharaja Vasu
King Mahamegha Vahana
Sobhanaraja
Chandraja
Ksemaraja
Vakradeva (or) Virdhharaja
Kharavela (c. 193 BCE–155 BCE)
Kudepasiri Vakradeva ll
Vaduka
Galaveya
 Mana-Sada
 Siri-Sada
 Maha-Sada
 Sivamaka-Sada
 Asaka-Sada

Kingdom of Kangleipak (Manipur) (c. 200 BCE –1950 CE)

The Meitei people are made up of seven major clans, known as Salai Taret
The clans include–
Mangang
Khuman Salai
Luwang
Angom
Moilang
Khaba Nganba
Salai Leishangthem

Ancient dynasty of Kangleipak (c. 200 BCE −33 CE)

Khapa-Nganpa Salai

Taang-chaa Leela Pakhangpa (200 BCE)
Kangba
Maliya Fampalcha (150 BCE)
Kaksu Tonkonpa
Koilou Nongtailen Pakhangpa
Samlungpha (44–34 BCE)
Chingkhong Poireiton (34–18 BCE )
Singtabung (18–8 BCE)
Paangminnaba (8–1 BCE)

Luwang Salai

Luwang Khunthipa (1–5 CE)
Luwang Punshipa (5–33 CE)

Ningthouja or Mangang dynasty (c. 33–1074 CE)

Nongta Lailen Pakhangpa (33–154 CE)
Khuiyoi Tompok (154–264 CE)
Taothingmang (264–364 CE)
Khui Ningonba (364–379 CE)
Pengsipa (379–394 CE)
Kaokhangpa (394–411 CE)
Naokhampa (411–428 CE)
Naophangpa (428–518 CE)
Sameilang (518–568 CE)
Urakonthoupa (568–658 CE)
Naothingkhon (663–763 CE)
Khongtekcha (763–773 CE)
Keilencha (784–799 CE)
Yalaba (799–821 CE)
Ayangpa (821–910 CE)
Ningthoucheng (910–949 CE)
Chenglei-Ipan-Lanthapa (949–969 CE)
Keiphaba Yanglon (969–984 CE)
Irengba (984–1074 CE)

Kangleipak dynasty (c. 1074–1819 CE)

 Loiyumpa (1074–1112)
 Loitongpa (1112–1150)
 Atom Yoilempa	(1150–1163)
 Iyanthapa   (1163–1195)
 Thayanthapa (1195–1231)
 Chingthang Lanthapa (1231–1242)
 Thingpai Shelhongpa (1242–1247)
 Pulanthapa (1247–1263)
 Khumompa (1263–1278)
 Moilampa (1278–1302)
 Thangpi Lanthapa (1302–1324)
 Kongyampa (1324–1335)
 Telheipa (1335–1355)
 Tonapa (1355–1359)
 Tapungpa (1359–1394)
 Lailenpa (1394–1399)
 Punsipa (1404–1432)
 Ningthoukhompa (1432–1467)
 Senpi Kiyampa (1467–1508)
 Koilempa (1508–1512)
 Lamkhyampa (1512–1523)
 Nonginphapa (1523–1524)
 Kapompa (1524–1542)
 Tangchampa (1542–1545)
 Chalampa (1545–1562)
 Mungyampa (1562–1597)
 Khaki Ngampa(1597–1652)
 Khunchaopa (1652–1666)
 Paikhompa (1666–1697)
 Charairongba (1697–1709)
 Gharib Nawaz (Ningthem Pamheipa) (1709–1754), (adoption of the name Manipur)
 Chit Sain (1754–1756)
 Gaurisiam (1756–1763)
 Ching-Thang Khomba (Bhagya Chandra) (1764–1798)
 Rohinchandra (Harshachandra Singh) (1798–1801)
 Maduchandra Singh (1801–1806)
 Charajit Singh (1806–1812)
 Marjit Singh (1812–1819)
(Came to power with Burmese support).

Burmese rule (c. 1819–1825 CE)

Princely State (c. 1825–1947 CE)

 Gambhir Singh (1825–1834)
(Restored after the First Anglo-Burmese War)
Regency for Chandrakirti Singh (1834–1850)
 Nara Singh (1844–1850)
 Debendro Singh (1850)
 Chandrakirti Singh (1850–1886)
 Surchandra Singh (1886–1890)
 Kulachandra Singh (1890–1891)
 Churachand Singh (1891–1941)
 Bodhchandra Singh (1941–1947)

Kuninda Kingdom (c. 2nd century BCE to 3rd century CE)

The Kingdom of Kuninda was an ancient central Himalayan kingdom documented from around the 2nd century BCE to the 3rd century CE, located in the southern areas of modern Himachal Pradesh and far western areas of Uttarakhand in North India.

The only known ruler of Kuninda Kingdom is
 Amoghabhuti (late 2nd to early 1st century BCE)

Foreign Assimilated Kingdoms in Indian Subcontinent 

These empires were vast, centered in Persia or the Mediterranean; their satrapies (provinces) in India were at their outskirts.

The sequence of there invasions are-
 The boundaries of the Achaemenid Empire after conquest of Indus valley reached North-West of the Indus River in 535 to 518 BCE.
 Alexander the Great (326–323 BCE) of the Argead dynasty who fought Porus in the Battle of the Hydaspes River.
 Seleucus I Nicator (323–321 BCE), diadochos was defeated by Chandragupta Maurya in Seleucid–Mauryan war 305 BCE.
 The Hellenistic Euthydemid Dynasty under Demetrius I also reached the north-western frontiers of India in 200s BCE.

Indo-Greek Kingdom (Yavanarajya) (c. 200 BCE – 10 CE) 

 Demetrius I (c. 200–190 BCE), founder of dynasty
 Euthydemus II ( c.  190–185 BCE)
 Pantaleon (c. 190–180 BCE)
 Demetrius II of India
 Antimachus I (c. 171–160 BCE)
 Antimachus II (c. 170–165 BCE)
 Menander I (c. 165/155–130 BCE)
Agathokleia (c. 130–125)
 Strato I (c. 125–105 BCE)
Demetrius III Aniketos (c. 105–100 BCE)
Amyntas Nikator (c. 100–90 BCE)
Menander II (c. 90–80 BCE) 
Demetrius IV (c.  80–30 BCE)
Strato II (c. 30–10 BCE)
Strato III (c. 10 CE), last ruler

Indo-Scythian (Saka) ( c. 12 BCE – 395 CE)

Aprācas rulers (c. 12 BCE − 45 CE ) 

 Vijayamitra (c. 12 BCE − 15 CE)
 Indravasu (c. 15 – 20 CE)
 Vispavarman
 Iṃdravarmo
 Aspa (c. 20 – 45 CE)
 Sasan (c. 45 – 50 CE)

Northern Satraps rulers (Mathura area) (c. 20 BCE – 20 CE) 

 Hagamasha (satrap)
 Hagana (satrap)
 Rajuvula (Great Satrap) (c. 10 CE)
 Sodasa

Minor local rulers 
 Bhadayasa
 Mamvadi
 Arsakes

Northwestern Scythian rulers (c. 85 BCE – 10 CE) 

 Maues (c. 85–60 BCE)
 Vonones (c. 75–65 BCE)
 Spalahores (c. 75–65 BCE)
 Spalarises (c. 60–57 BCE)
 Azes I (c. 57–35 BCE)
 Azilises (c. 57–35 BCE)
 Azes II (c. 35–12 BCE)
 Zeionises (c. 10 BCE–10 CE)
 Kharahostes (c. 10 BCE–10 CE)

Kshaharatas rulers 

 Liaka Kusuluka
 Kusulaka Patika
 Bhumaka
 Nahapana (founder of the Western Satraps)

Western Satraps (Western Saka) (c. 119 – 395 CE) 

 Nahapana (c. 119–124)
 Chastana (c. 124)
 Jayadaman (c. 124–130)
 Rudradaman I (c. 130–150)
 Damajadasri I (170–175)
 Jivadaman (175–199)
 Rudrasimha I (175–188)
 Isvaradatta (188–191)
 Rudrasimha I (restored) (191–197)
 Jivadaman (restored) (197–199)
 Rudrasena I (200–222)
 Samghadaman (222–223)
 Damasena (223–232)
 Damajadasri II (232–239) with
 Viradaman (234–238)
 Yasodaman I (239)
 Vijayasena (239–250)
 Damajadasri III (251–255)
 Rudrasena II (255–277)
 Visvasimha (277–282)
 Bhratadarman (282–295) 
 Visvasena (293–304)
 Rudrasimha II, son of Lord (Svami) Jivadaman (304–348) with
 Yasodaman II (317–332)
 Rudradaman II (332–348)
 Rudrasena III (348–380)
 Simhasena (Indo-Scythian ruler) (380–382)
 Rudrasena IV (382–388)
 Rudrasimha III (388–395)

Pāratas rulers (c. 125 – 300 CE) 

 Yolamira (c. 125–150)
 Bagamira (c. 150)
 Arjuna (c. 150–160)
 Hvaramira (c. 160–175)
 Mirahvara (c. 175–185)
 Miratakhma (c. 185–200)
 Kozana (c. 200–220)
 Bhimarjuna (c. 220–235)
 Koziya (c. 235–265)
 Datarvharna (c. 265–280)
 Datayola II (c. 280–300)

Kushan Empire (c. 1 – 375 CE)

Indo-Parthian (Pahalava) (c. 21 – 100 CE) 

 Gondophares I (c. 21–50)
 Abdagases I (c. 50–65)
 Satavastres (c. 60)
 Sarpedones (c. 70)
 Orthagnes (c. 70)
 Ubouzanes (c. 77)
 Sases or Gondophares II (c. 85)
 Abdagases II (c. 90)
 Pakores (c. 100)

Indo-Sasanian Kingdom (c. 233 – 365 CE) 

 Ardashir I Kushanshah (233–245 CE)
 Peroz I Kushanshah (245–275 CE)
 Hormizd I Kushanshah (275–300 CE)
 Hormizd II Kushanshah (300–303 CE)
 Peroz II Kushanshah (303–330 CE)
 Varahran Kushanshah (330-365 CE)

Alchon Huns (Huna) (c. 400 – 670 CE) 

 Anonymous kings (c. 400 – 430 CE)
 Khingila  (c. 430 – 490 CE)
 Javukha/Zabocho (c. mid 5th – early 6th CE)
 Mehama (c. 461 – 493 CE)
 Lakhana Udayaditya (c. 490's CE)
 Aduman
 Toramana (c. 490 – 515 CE)
 Mihirakula (c. 515 – 540 CE)
 Toramana II (c. 530 – 570 CE)
 Pravarasena (c. 530 – 590 CE)
 Gokarna  (c. 570 – 590 CE)
 Narendraditya Khinkhila (c. 590 – 630 CE)
 Yudhishthira (630 – 670 CE)

Chutu dynasty of Banavasi (c. 100 BCE–200 CE)

The following Chutu rulers are known from coins and inscriptions:

 Chutukulananda
 Mulananda
 Sivalananda

Nagvanshi dynasty of Chotanagpur (c. 64–1952 CE)

Following is the list of Nagvanshi rulers according to Nagpuri poem "Nagvanshavali" written by Beniram Mehta and book "Nagvansh" written by Lal Pradumn Singh. The list of Kings and chronology varies in these books. 57th Nagvanshi king Dripnath Shah (c.1762–1790 CE) submitted list of Nagvanshi kings to Governor general of India in 1787.

Rajas and Maharajas of Chotanagpur
Raja Phani Mukut Rai (c. 64 – 162 CE), first Raja
Raja Mukut Rai (c. 162 – 221 CE) 
Raja Ghat Rai (c. 221 – 278 CE)
Raja Madan Rai (c. 278 – 307 CE) 
Raja Pratap Rai (c. 307 – 334 CE) 
Raja Kandrap Rai (c. 334 – 365 CE)
Raja Udaimani Rai (c. 365 – 403 CE) 
Raja Jaimani Rai (c. 403 – 452 CE) 
Raja Srimani Rai (c. 452 – 476 CE) 
Raja Phani Rai (c. 476 – 493 CE) 
Raja Gendu Rai (c. 493 – 535 CE)
Raja Hari Rai (c. 535 – 560 CE)
Raja Gajraj Rai (c. 560 – 606 CE)
Raja Sundar Rai (c. 606 – 643 CE)
Raja Mukund Rai (c. 643 – 694 CE)
Raja Udai Rai (c. 694 – 736 CE) 
Raja Kanchan Rai (c. 736 – 757 CE) 
Raja Magan Rai (c. 757 – 798 CE)
Raja Jagan Rai (c. 798 – 837 CE)
Raja Mohan Rai (c. 837 – 901 CE)
Raja Gajdant Rai (c. 901 – 931 CE)
Raja Gajghant Rai (c. 931 – 964 CE)
Raja Chandan Rai (c. 964 – 992 CE)
Raja Anand Rai (c. 992 – 1002 CE)
Raja Sripati Rai (c. 1002 – 1055 CE)
Raja Jaganand Rai (c. 1055 – 1074 CE)
Raja Nripendra Rai (c. 1074 -1084 CE)
Raja Gandharva Rai (c. 1084 -1098 CE)
Raja Bhim Karn (c.1098 -c.1132)
Raja Jash Karn (c.1132-c.1180)
Raja Jai Karn (c.1180-c.1218)
Raja Go Karn (c.1218-c.1236)
Raja Hari Karn (c.1236-c.1276)
Raja Shiv Karn (c.1276-c.1299) 
Raja Benu Karn (c.1299-c.1360)
Raja Phenu Karn 
Raja Tihuli Karn 
Raja Shivdas Karn (c.1367-c.1389)
Raja Udai Karn (c.1389-c.1427)
Raja Pritvi Karn (c.1427-c.1451)
Raja Pratap Karn (c.1451-c.1469)
Raja Chhatra Karn (c.1469 – c.1515)
Raja Virat Karn (c.1515 – c.1522)
Raja Sindhu Karn (c.1522 – c.1535)
Raja Madhu Karn Shah (c. 1584 -c.1599)
Raja Bairisal (c. 1599 -c.1614)
Raja Durjan Sal (c. 1614–1615)(c.1627 -c.1640)
Raja Deo Shah 
Raja Raghunath Shah (1640–1690)
Raja Ram Shah (1690–1715)
Raja Yadunath Shah (1715–1724)
Raja Shivnath Shah (1724–1733)
Raja Udainath Shah (1733–1740)
Raja Shyamsundar Nath Shah (1740–1745)
Raja Balram Nath Shah (1745–1748)
Raja Maninath Shah (1748–1762)
Raja Dhripnath Shah (1762–1790)
Raja Deo Nath Shah (1790–1806)
Maharaja Gobind Nath Shah Deo (1806–1822), first Maharaja
Maharaja Jagannath Shah Deo (1822–1872)
Maharaja Udai Pratap Nath Shah Deo (1872–1950)
Maharaja Lal Chintamani Sharan Nath Shahdeo (1950–1952)

Bharshiva dynasty (Nagas of Padmavati) (c. 170–350 CE) 

Vrisha-naga
(Possibly ruled at Vidisha in the late 2nd Century).
Vrishabha or Vrisha-bhava
(May also be the name of a distinct king who succeeded Vrisha-naga).
Bhima-naga (210–230 CE)
(Probably the first king to rule from Padmavati)
Skanda-naga
Vasu-naga
Brihaspati-naga
Vibhu-naga
Ravi-naga
Bhava-naga
Prabhakara-naga
Deva-naga
Vyaghra-naga
Ganapati-naga

Chandra dynasty (c. 202–1050 CE)

List of rulers–

Abhira dynasty of Nasik (203–370 CE)

The following is the list of the sovereign and strong Abhira rulers:

 Abhira Sivadatta
 Sakasena alias Saka Satakrni
 Abhira Ishwarsena alias Mahaksatrapa Isvaradatta
 Abhira Vashishthiputra Vasusena

Gupta Empire (c. 240 – 750 CE) 

Imperial Gupta rulers-

Later Gupta dynasty (c. 490 – 750 CE) 

The genealogy of Later Gupta rulers regin is disputed, this list is approx to there original regin:

Vakataka dynasty (c. 250–500 CE)

Pallava dynasty (c. 275 – 897 CE) 

Early or Middle Pallavs rulers regin is disputed, this timeline is approx to there original regin:

Aulikara Empire (c. 300 – 550 CE) 

Rulers of First Aulikara dynasty-
 Jayavarma
 Simhavarma
 Naravarma
 Vishvavarma
 Bandhuvarma

Rulers of Second Aulikara dynasty-
 Drumavardhana 
 Jayavardhana
 Ajitavardhana
 Vibhishanavardhana
 Rajyavardhana
 Prakashadharma
 Yashodharman (c. 515–545 CE)

Kadamba dynasties (345 – 1310 CE)

Kadamba dynasty of Banavasi (c. 345 – 540 CE) 

Banavasi branch rulers-

 Mayurasharma (345–365)
 Kangavarma (365–390)
 Bhageerath (390–415)
 Raghu (415–435)
 Kakusthavarma (435–455)
 Santivarma (455–460)
 Shiva Mandhatri (460–475)
 Mrigeshavarma (475–485)
 Ravivarma (485–519)
 Harivarma (519–530)

Triparvatha branch rulers-

 Krishna Varma I (455–475)
 Vishnuvarma (475–485)
 Simhavarma (485–516)
 Krishna Varma II (516–540)

Kadamba dynasty of Goa (960 – 1345 CE) 

 Shashthadeva I alis Kantakacharya	(c. 960 CE), founder of dynasty
 Nagavarma
 Guhalladeva I	
 Shashathadeva II	
 Guhalladeva II	 (1038–1042)
 Veeravarmadeva (	1042–1054)
 Jayakeshi I	 (1054–1080)
 Guhalladeva II alias Tribhuvanamalla	(1080–1125)
 Vijayaditya I alias Vijayarka, 	(ruling prince up to 1104) 
 Jayakeshi II	(1125–1148)
 Shivachitta alis Paramadideva (	1148–1179)
 Vishnuchitta alias Vijayaditya II	(1179–1187)
 Jayakeshi III	 (1188–1216)
 Vajradeva alis Shivachitta (regin?)
 Sovideva alis Tribhuvanamalla (1216–1246?)
 Shashthadeva III	(?1246–1265)
 Kamadeva	(1265–1310), last known ruler of dynasty

Kadamba dynasty of Hangal (980 – 1275 CE) 

known rulers are-
 Chattadeva (980–1031), founder of dynasty
 Kamadeva
 Somadeva
 Mayuravarma

Other minor Kadamba Kingdoms 
Kadambas of Halasi
Kadambas of Bankapur
Kadambas of Bayalnad
Kadambas of Nagarkhanda
Kadambas of Uchchangi
Kadambas of Bayalnadu (Vainadu)

Varman dynasty of Kamarupa (350–650 CE)

The dynastic line, as given in the Dubi and Nidhanpur copperplate inscriptions:

Ganga dynasty (350–1424 CE)

Other minor Ganga states

Gudari Kataka Ganga State 

According to Gangavansucharitam written in sixteenth or seventeenth century, Bhanu Deva IV also known as Kajjala Bhanu founded a new small princedom in southern Odisha at Gudari in modern Rayagada district after he was toppled from power by his general Kapilendra Deva.

 Kajjala Bhanu (or Bhanu Deva IV)
 Svarna Bhanu
 Kalasandha Deva
 Chudanga Deva
 Harimani Deva
 Narasimha Deva
 Ananta Deva
 Padmanabha Deva
 Pitambara Deva
 Vasudeva
 Purrushottama Anangabhima Deva (or Bhima Deva)

Chikiti Ganga State (c. 881–1950 CE) 

Historians conclude that the rulers of Chikiti were from the line of Ganga ruler Hastivarman.

 Kesaba Rautara (or Bira Karddama Singha Rautara) (881–940)
 Balabhadra Rautara (941–997)
 Madhaba Rautara (998–1059)
 Languli Rautara (1060–1094)
 Mohana Rautara (1095–1143)
 Balarama Rautara (1144–1197)
 Biswanatha Rautara (1198–1249)
 Harisarana Rautara (1250–1272)
 Raghunatha Rautara (1273–1313)
 Dinabandhu Rautara (1314–1364)
 Gopinatha Rautara (1365–1417)
 Ramachandra Rautara (1418–1464)
 Narayana Rautara (1465–1530)
 Narasingha Rautara (1531–1583)
 Lokanatha Rautara (1584–1633)
 Jadumani Rautara (1634–1691)
 Madhusudana Rajendra Deba (1692–1736)
 Kulamani Rajendra Deba (1737–1769)
 Krusnachandra Rajendra Deba (1770–1790)
 Pitambara Rajendra Deba (1791–1819)
 Gobindachandra Rajendra Deba (1820–1831)
 Kulamani Rajendra Deba (1832–1835)
 Brundabanachandra Rajendra Deba (1835–1846)
 Jagannatha Rajendra Deba (1847–1855)
 Biswambhara Rajendra Deba (1856–1885)
 Kisorachandra Rajendra Deba (1885–1903)
 Radhamohana Rajendra Deba (1903–1923)
 Gaurachandra Rajendra Deba (1923–1934)
 Sachhidananda Rajendra Deba (1934–1950)

Parlakhemundi Ganga State (c. 1309–1950) 

Parlakhemundi state rulers were the direct descendants of the Eastern Ganga dynasty rulers of Odisha.

 Narasingha Deba (1309–1320)
 Madanrudra Deba (1320–1339)
 Narayana Rudra Deba (1339–1353)
 Ananda Rudra Deba (1353–1354)
 Ananda Rudra Deba (1354–1367)
 Jayarudra Deba (1367–1399)
 Lakhsmi Narasingha Deba (1399–1418)
 Madhukarna Gajapati (1418–1441)
 Murtunjaya Bhanu Deba (1441–1467)
 Madhaba Bhanu Deba (1467–1495)
 Chandra Betal Bhanu Deba (1495–1520)
 Subarnalinga Bhanu Deba (1520–1550)
 Sibalinga Narayan Bhanudeo (1550–1568)
 Subarna Kesari Govinda Gajapati Narayan Deo (1568–1599)
 Mukunda Rudra Gajapati Narayan Deo (1599–1619) 
 Mukunda Deo (1619–1638)
 Ananta Padmanabh Gajapati Narayan Deo I (1638–1648)
 Sarbajgan Jagannatha Gajapati Narayan Deo I (1648–1664)
 Narahari Narayan Deo (1664–1691) 
 Bira Padmanabh Narayan Deo II (1691–1706)
 Prataprudra Gajapati Narayan Deo I (1706–1736)
 Jagannatha Gajapati Narayana Deo II  (1736–1771)
 Goura Chandra Gajapati Narayan Deo I (1771–1803)
 Purushottam Gajapati Narayan Deo (1803–1806)
 Jagannath Gajapati Narayan Deo III (1806–1850)
 Prataprudra Gajapati Narayan Deo II (1850–1885)
 Goura Chandra Gajapati Narayan Deo II (1885–1904)
 Krushna Chandra Gajapati Narayan Deo (1913–1950)
 Krushna Chandra Gajapati Narayan Deo (1950 – 25 May 1974), titular
 Gopinath Gajapati Narayan Deo (25 May 1974 – 10 January 2020), titular
 Kalyani Gajapati (10 January 2020–present), titular

Traikutaka dynasty (c. 370–520 CE)

The following Traikuta rulers are known from the coins and inscriptions of Gupta Empire:

 Maharaja Indradatta (415–440 CE)
 Maharaja Dahrasena
 Maharaja Vyaghrasena, son of Dahrasena (480 CE)
 Maharaja Madhyamasena
 Vikramasena

Vishnukundina dynasty (c. 420–624 CE)

 Madhava Varma I (420–455)
 Indra Varma (455–461)
Madhava Verma II (461–508)
 Vikramendra Varma I (508–528)
 Indra Bhattaraka Varma (528–580)
 Janssraya Madhava Varma IV (580–624)

Maitraka dynasty of Vallabhi (c. 475–776 CE)

 Bhatarka (c. 475–492)
 Dharasena I (c. 493–499)
 Dronasinha (also known as Maharaja) (c. 500–520)
 Dhruvasena I (c. 520–550)
 Dharapatta (c. 550–556)
 Guhasena (c. 556–570)
 Dharasena II (c. 570–595)
 Siladitya I (also known as Dharmaditya) (c. 595–615)
 Kharagraha I (c. 615–626)
 Dharasena III (c. 626–640)
 Dhruvasena II (also known as Baladitya) (c. 640–644)
 Chkravarti king Dharasena IV (also known as Param Bhatarka, Maharajadhiraja, Parameshwara) (c. 644–651)
 Dhruvasena III (c. 651–656)
 Kharagraha II (c. 656–662)
 Siladitya II
 Siladitya III
 Siladitya IV
 Siladitya V
 Siladitya VI
 Siladitya VII (c. 766 CE)

Rai dynasty (c. 489–632 CE)

Rai Diwa ji (Devaditya)
Rai Sahiras (Shri Harsha)
Rai Sahasi (Sinhasena)
Rai Sahiras II, died battling the King of Nimroz
Rai Sahasi II, the last of the line

Chalukya dynasty (c. 500–1200 CE)

Shahi Kingdom (c. 500–1026 CE) 

In Kabul Shahi Kingdom two Dynasties ruled (both were Hindu dynasties) from:
Turk Shahi (c. 500–850 CE)
Hindu Shahi (c. 850–1026 CE)

Turk Shahi dynasty (c. 500–850 CE) 

Nandin Rulers of Gilgit   (500–552)
 Khingala of Kapisa  (535–552)
 Patoladeva / Navasurendradiyta (552–575)
 Srideva / Surendra Vikrmadiyta (575–605)
 Patoladeva / Vajraditya  (605–645)
 Barha Tegin   (645–680)
 Tegin Sha  (680–739)
 Fromo Kesar / Gesar  (739–755)

Hindu Shahi dynasty (c. 850–1026 CE) 

 Samantadeva Kallar / Lalliya  (850–895), first ruler of dynasty
 Kamalavarmadeva / Kamaluka (895–921)
 Bhimadeva (921–964)
 Ishtthapala (ruled 8 months)
 Jayapala (964–1001)
 Anandapala (1001–1010)
 Trilochanapala (1010–22) assassinated by mutinous troops)
 Bhimapala (died in 1022–1026), last ruler of dynasty

Pushyabhuti dynasty (c. 500 – 647 CE) 

Rulers-

Jaintia Kingdom (c. 515–1835 CE)

Old dynasty
Urmi Rani (?-550)
Krishak Pator (550–570)
Hatak (570–600)
Guhak (600–630)

Partitioned Jaintia
Jayanta (630–660)
Joymalla (660-?)
Mahabal (?)
Bancharu (?-1100)
Kamadeva (1100–1120)
Bhimbal (1120)

Brahmin dynasty
Kedareshwar Rai (1120–1130)
Dhaneshwar Rai (1130–1150)
Kandarpa Rai (1150–1170)
Manik Rai (1170–1193)
Jayanta Rai (1193–1210)
Jayanti Devi
Bara Gossain

New dynasty
Prabhat Ray Syiem Sutnga (1500–1516)
Majha Gosain Syiem Sutnga (1516–1532)
Burha Parbat Ray Syiem Sutnga (1532–1548)
Bar Gosain Syiem Sutnga I (1548–1564)
Bijay Manik Syiem Sutnga (1564–1580)
Pratap Ray Syiem Sutnga (1580–1596)
Dhan Manik Syiem Sutnga (1596–1612)
Jasa Manik Syiem Sutnga (1612–1625)
Sundar Ray Syiem Sutnga (1625–1636)
Chota Parbat Ray Syiem Sutnga (1636–1647)
Jasamanta Ray Syiem Sutnga (1647–1660)
Ban Singh Syiem Sutnga (1660–1669)
Pratap Singh Syiem Sutnga (1669–1678)
Lakshmi Narayan Syiem Sutnga (1678–1694)
Ram Singh Syiem Sutnga I (1694–1708)
Jay Narayan Syiem Sutnga (1708–1731)
Bar Gosain Syiem Sutnga II (1731–1770)
Chattra Singh Syiem Sutnga (1770–1780)
Yatra Narayan Syiem Sutnga (1780–1785)
Bijay Narayan Syiem Sutnga (1785–1786)
Lakshmi Singh Syiem Sutnga (1786–1790)
Ram Singh Syiem Sutnga II (1790–1832)
Rajendra Singh Syiem Sutnga (1832–1835)

Kalachuri dynasties (c. 550 – 1225 CE)

Kalachuri dynasty of Mahishmati/Malwa (Early Kalachuris) (c. 550 – 625 CE) 

The following are the known rulers of the Kalachuri dynasty of Malwa with their estimated reigns (IAST names in brackets):
 Krishnaraja (Kṛṣṇarāja) (r. c. 550–575 CE)
 Shankaragana (Śaṃkaragaṇa) (r. c. 575–600 CE)
 Buddharaja (Buddharāja) (r. c. 600–625 CE)

Kalachuri dynasty of Tripuri/Chedi (Later Kalachuris) (c. 675 – 1212 CE) 

Rulers-
 Vamaraja-deva (675–700 CE), founder of dynasty
 Shankaragana I (750–775 CE)
 Lakshmana-raja I (825–850 CE)
 Kokalla I (850–890 CE); his younger son established the Ratnapura Kalachuri branch
 Shankaragana II (890–910 CE), alias Mugdhatunga
 Balaharsha (910–915 CE)
 Yuvaraja-deva I (915–945 CE)
 Lakshmana-raja II (945–970 CE)
 Shankaragana III (970–980 CE)
 Yuvaraja-deva II (980–990 CE)
 Kokalla II (990–1015 CE)
 Gangeya-deva (1015–1041 CE)
 Lakshmi-karna (1041–1073 CE), alias Karna
 Yashah-karna (1073–1123 CE)
 Gaya-karna (1123–1153 CE)
 Nara-simha (1153–1163 CE)
 Jaya-simha (1163–1188 CE)
 Vijaya-simha (1188–1210 CE)
 Trailokya-malla (c. 1210– at least 1212 CE), last ruler

Kalachuri dynasty of Ratnapura (c. 1000 – 1225 CE) 

The following is a list of the Ratnapura Kalachuri rulers, with estimated period of their reigns:
 Kalinga-raja (1000–1020 CE), founder of dynasty
 Kamala-raja (1020–1045 CE)
 Ratna-raja (1045–1065 CE), alias Ratna-deva I
 Prithvi-deva I (1065–1090 CE), alias Prithvisha
 Jajalla-deva I (1090–1120 CE) (declared independence)
 Ratna-Deva II (1120–1135 CE) 
 Prithvi-deva II (1135–1165 CE)
 Jajalla-deva II (1165–1168 CE)
 Jagad-deva (1168–1178 CE)
 Ratna-deva III (1178–1200 CE)
 Pratapa-malla (1200–1225 CE)
 Parmardi Dev (governor of Eastern Gangas)

Kalachuri dynasty of Kalyani (Southern Kalachuris) (c. 1130 – 1184 CE) 

Rulers-
 Bijjala II (1130–1167), proclaimed independence from Kalyani Chalukyas in 1162 CE
 Sovideva (1168–1176)
 Mallugi, overthrown by his brother Sankama
 Sankama (1176–1180)
 Ahavamalla (1180–83)
 Singhana (1183–84), last ruler

Patola/Gilgit Shahi dynasty (c. 550 – 750 CE) 

Regin of known rulers is disputed-

 Somana (Mid 6th century CE)
 Vajraditayanandin (585–605 CE)
 Vikramadityanandin (605–625 CE)
 Surendravikramadityanandin (625–644 or 654 CE)
 Navasurendrāditya-nandin (644 or 654–685 CE)
 Jayamaṅgalavikramāditya-nandin (685–710 CE)
 Nandivikramadityanandin (710–715 CE)
 Su-fu-che-li-chi-li-ni (name by foreign sources) (715–720 CE)
 Surendradityanandin (720–740 or 750 CE), last known ruler

Gurjara-Pratihara Empire (c. 550 – 1036 CE)

Pratiharas of Mandavyapura (Mandor) (c. 550 – 860 CE) 

R. C. Majumdar, on the other hand, assumed a period of 25 years for each generation, and placed him in c. 550 CE. The following is a list of the dynasty's rulers (IAST names in brackets) and estimates of their reigns, assuming a period of 25 years.

 Harichandra (Haricandra) alias Rohilladhi (r. c. 550 CE), founder of dynasty
 Rajilla (r. c. 575 CE)
 Narabhatta (Narabhaṭa) alias Pellapelli (r. c. 600 CE)
 Nagabhata (Nāgabhaṭa) alias Nahada (r. c. 625 CE)
 Tata (Tāta) and Bhoja (r. c. 650 CE)
 Yashovardhana (Yaśovardhana) (r. c. 675 CE)
 Chanduka (Canduka) (r. c. 700 CE)
 Shiluka (Śīluka) alias Silluka (r. c. 725 CE)
 Jhota (r. c. 750 CE)
 Bhilladitya alias Bhilluka (r. c. 775 CE)
 Kakka (r. c. 800 CE)
 Bauka (Bāuka) (r. c. 825 CE)
 Kakkuka (r. c. 861 CE), last ruler

Imperial Pratiharas of Kannauj (c. 730 – 1036 CE) 

List of rulers–

Other Pratihara Branches

Baddoch Branch (c. 600 – 700 CE)
Known Baddoch rulers are-
Dhaddha 1 (600–627)
Dhaddha 2 (627–655)
Jaibhatta (655–700)

Rajogarh Branch
Badegujar were rulers of Rajogarh
Parmeshver Manthandev, (885–915)
No records found after Parmeshver Manthandev

Kingdom of Mewar (c. 566 – 1947 CE) 

In the 6th century, three different Guhila dynasties are known to have ruled in present-day Rajasthan:
Guhilas of Nagda-Ahar– most important branch and future ruling dynasty of Mewar.
Guhilas of Kishkindha (modern Kalyanpur)
Guhilas of Dhavagarta (modern Dhor)

Guhila dynasty (c. 566 – 1303 CE)

Branching of Guhil dynasty 

During reign of Rawal Ran Singh (1158–1168), the Guhil dynasty got divided into two branches.
First (Rawal Branch)
Rawal Khshem Singh (1168–1172), son of Ran Singh, ruled over Mewar by building Rawal Branch.
Second (Rana Branch)
Rahapa, the second son of Ran Singh started the Rana Branch by establishing Sisoda bases. Later Hammir Singh of Sisoda base started main Sisodia or Mewar dynasty in 1326 CE.

Rana branch rulers (c. 1168 – 1326 CE) 

"Rahapa", a son of Ranasimha alias Karna, established the Rana branch. According to the 1652 Eklingji inscription, Rahapa's successors were:

Sisodia dynasty (c. 1326 – 1947 CE)

Gauda Kingdom (c. 590 – 626 CE) 

 Shashanka (590–625 CE), first recorded independent king of Bengal, created the first unified political entity in Bengal
 Manava (625–626 CE), ruled for 8 months before being conquered by Harshavardhana and Bhaskarvarman

Chacha dynasty of Sindh (c. 632–724 CE)

The known rulers of the Brahman dynasty are:
 Chach (632–671 CE)
 Chandar (671–679 CE)
 Dāhir (679–712 CE) from Alor
Under the Umayyad Caliphate
 Dahirsiya (679–709 CE) from Brahmanabad
 Hullishāh (712–724 CE)
 Shishah (until 724 CE)

Karkota dynasty of Kashmir (c. 625–855 CE)

Durlabhavardhana (625–662), (founder of the dynasty) 
Durlabhaka or Pratipaditya (662–712)
Chandrapeeda or Varnaditya (712–720)
Tarapida or Udayaditya (720–724)
Lalitaditya Muktapida (724–760),  (built the famous Martand Sun Temple in Kashmir)
Kuvalayaditya (760–761)
Vajraditya or Bapyayika or Lalitapida (761–768)
Prithivyapida I (768–772)
Sangramapida (772–779)
Jayapida (also Pandit and poet) (779–813)
Lalitapida (813–825)
Sangramapida II (825–832)
Chipyata-Jayapida (832–885), (last ruler of dynasty)

Other puppet rulers under Utpala dynasty are

Ajitapida
Anangapida
Utpalapida
Sukhavarma

Chahamana (Chauhan) dynasties (c. 551 – 1315 CE) 

The ruling dynasties belonging to the Chauhan clan included–
Chahamanas of Shakambhari (Chauhans of Ajmer) (c. 551 – 1194 CE)
 Chahamanas of Naddula (Chauhans of Nadol) (c. 950 – 1197 CE)
 Chahamanas of Jalor (c. 1160 – 1311 CE), branched off from the Chahamanas of Naddula
 Chahamanas of Ranastambhapura (c. 1192 – 1301 CE), branched off from the Chahamanas of Shakambhari
 Chahamanas of Chandravati and Abu (Kingdom of Sirohi) (c. 1311 – 1949 CE)
 Chahamanas of Lata
 Chahamanas of Dholpur
 Chahamanas of Partabgarh
 Hada Chauhan kingdoms of Hadoti region are–
 Kingdom of Bundi (c. 1342 – 1949 CE)
 Kingdom of Kota (c. 1579 – 1948 CE)
 Kingdom of Jhalawar (c. 1838 – 1949 CE), branched off from the Kingdom of Kota in 1838 CE.

Chahamanas of Sambhar Ajmer and Delhi (c. 551 – 1194 CE) 

Following is a list of Chahamana rulers of Shakambhari, Ajmer and Delhi with approximate period of reign, as estimated historian by R. B. Singh:

Chahamanas of Naddula (c. 950 – 1197 CE) 

Following is a list of Chahmana rulers of Naddula, with approximate period of reign, as estimated by R. B. Singh:

Chahamanas of Jalor (c. 1160 – 1311 CE) 

The Chahamana rulers of the Jalor branch, with their estimated periods of reign, are as follows:

Virama-deva (1311 CE) was last ruler of dynasty, crowned during the Siege of Jalore, but died 2 days later.

Chahamanas of Ranastambhapura (c. 1192 – 1301 CE)

Mlechchha dynasty of Kamarupa (650–900 CE)

 Salastamba (650–670), founder of dynasty
 Vijaya alias Vigrahastambha
 Palaka
 Kumara
 Vajradeva
 Harshadeva alias Harshavarman (725–745)
 Balavarman II
 Jivaraja
 Digleswaravarman
 Salambha
 Harjjaravarman (815–832)
 Vanamalavarmadeva (832–855)
 Jayamala alias Virabahu (855–860)
 Balavarman III (860–880)
 Tyagasimha (890–900), last ruler of dynasty

Garhwal Kingdom of Uttrakhand (c. 688–1949 CE)

Mola Ram the 18th century painter, poet, historian and diplomat of Garhwal wrote the historical work Garhrajvansh Ka Itihas (History of the Garhwal royal dynasty) which is the only source of information about several Garhwal rulers.

Mallabhum (Bishnupur) kingdom (c. 694–1947 CE)

Mallabhum kingdom or Bishnupur kingdom was the kingdom ruled by the Malla kings of Bishnupur, primarily in the present Bankura district in Indian state of West Bengal. (also known as Mallabhoom),

Chand Kingdom of Kumaon (700–1790 CE)

Badri Datt Pandey, in his book Kumaun Ka Itihaas lists the Chand kings as following:

Karttikeyapur (Katyur) Kingdom (700–1065 CE) 

The period of certain Katyuri rulers, is generally determined as below, although there is some ambiguity in respect to exact number of years ruled by each King

List–
 Vasu Dev (700–849 CE)
 Basantana Dev (850–870 CE)
 Kharpar Dev (870–880 CE)
 Abhiraj Dev (880–890 CE)
 Tribhuvanraj Dev (890–900 CE)
 Nimbarta Dev (900–915 CE)
 Istanga (915–930 CE)
 Lalitasura Dev (930–955 CE)
 Bhu Dev (955–970 CE)
 Salonaditya (970–985 CE)
 Ichchhata Dev (985–1000 CE)
 Deshat Dev (1000–1015 CE)
 Padmata Dev (1015–1045 CE)
 Subhiksharaja Dev (1045–1060 CE)
 Dham Dev (1060–1064 CE)
 Bir Dev (Very short period until 1065 CE)

Varman dynasty of Kannauj (c. 725–770 CE)

 Yashovarman (c. 725–752 CE), founder of dynasty
 Āma
 Dunduka
 Bhoja (ruled until 770 CE), last ruler of dynasty.

Rashtrakuta Empire of Manyakheta (c. 735–982 CE)

 Dantidurga (735–756 CE), founder of dynasty
 Krishna I (756–774 CE)
 Govinda II (774–780 CE)
 Dhruva Dharavarsha (780–793 CE)
 Govinda III (793–814 CE)
 Amoghavarsha I (814–878 CE), he was the founded of Manyakheta city, which became the capital of the dynasty.
 Krishna II (878–914 CE)
 Indra III (914–929 CE)
 Amoghavarsha II (929–932 CE)
 Govinda IV (930–935 CE)
 Amoghavarsha III (934–939 CE)
 Krishna III (939–967 CE)
 Khottiga Amoghavarsha (967–972 CE)
 Karka II or Amoghhavarsha IV (972–973 CE)
 Indra IV (973–982 CE), was the only a claimer for the lost throne.

Tomar dynasty of Delhi (c. 736–1151 CE) 

Various historical texts provide different lists of the Tomara kings:

 Khadag Rai's history of Gwalior (Gopācala ākhyāna) names 18 Tomara kings, plus Prithvi Pala (who is probably the Chahamana king Prithviraja III). According to Khadag Rai, Delhi was originally ruled by the legendary king Vikramaditya. It was deserted for 792 years after his death, until Bilan Dev [Veer Mahadev or Birmaha] of Tomara dynasty re-established the city (in 736 CE).
 The Kumaon-Garhwal manuscript names only 15 rulers of "Toar" dynasty, and dates the beginning of their rule to 789 CE (846 Vikram Samvat).
 Abul Fazl's Ain-i-Akbari (Bikaner manuscript, edited by Syed Ahmad Khan) names 19 Tomara kings. It places the first Tomara king in 372 CE (429 Vikram Samvat). It might be possible that the era mentioned in the original source used by Abul Fazl was Gupta era, which starts from 318 to 319 CE; Abul Fazl might have mistaken this era to be Vikrama Samvat. If this is true, then the first Tomara king can be dated to 747 CE (429+318), which is better aligned with the other sources.

As stated earlier, the historians doubt the claim that the Tomaras established Delhi in 736 CE.

Pala dynasty of Bengal (c. 750 – 1174 CE)

Shilahara dynasty of Maharashtra (765–1265 CE)

Shilahara Kingdom was split into three branches:
 First branch ruled North Konkan
 Second branch ruled South Konkan (between 765 and 1029 CE)
 Third branch ruled in modern districts of Kolhapur, Satara and Belgaum (between 940 and 1215 CE) after which they were overwhelmed by the Yadavas.

South Konkan branch (c. 765–1020 CE)

List of rulers–
 Sanaphulla (765–795 CE)
 Dhammayira (795–820 CE)
 Aiyaparaja (820–845 CE)
 Avasara I (845–870 CE)
 Adityavarma (870–895 CE)
 Avasara II (895–920 CE)
 Indraraja (920–945 CE)
 Bhima (945–970 CE)
 Avasara III (970–995 CE)
 Rattaraja (995–1020 CE)

North Konkan (Thane) branch (c. 800–1265 CE)
List of rulers–

 Kapardin I (800–825 CE)
 Pullashakti (825–850 CE)
 Kapardin II (850–880 CE)
 Vappuvanna (880–910 CE)
 Jhanjha (910–930 CE)
 Goggiraja (930–945 CE)
 Vajjada I (945–965 CE)
 Chhadvaideva (965–975 CE)
 Aparajita (975–1010 CE)
 Vajjada II (1010–1015 CE)
 Arikesarin (1015–1022 CE)
 Chhittaraja (1022–1035 CE)
 Nagarjuna (1035–1045 CE)
 Mummuniraja (1045–1070 CE)
 Ananta Deva I (1070–1127 CE)
 Aparaditya I (1127–1148 CE)
 Haripaladeva (1148–1155 CE)
 Mallikarjuna (1155–1170 CE)
 Aparaditya II ( 1170–1197 CE)
 Ananta Deva II (1198–1200 CE)
 Keshideva II (1200–1245 CE)
 Ananta Deva III (1245–1255 CE)
 Someshvara (1255–1265 CE), last ruler of dynasty

Kolhapur branch (c. 940–1212 CE)
List of rulers–

 Jatiga I (940–960 CE)
 Naivarman (960–980 CE)
 Chandra (980–1000 CE)
 Jatiga II (1000–1020 CE)
 Gonka (1020–1050 CE)
 Guhala I (1050 CE)
 Kirtiraja (1050 CE)
 Chandraditya (1050 CE)
 Marsimha (1050–1075 CE)
 Guhala II (1075–1085 CE)
 Bhoja I (1085–1100 CE)
 Ballala (1100–1108 CE)
 Gonka II (1108 CE)
 Gandaraditya I (1108–1138 CE)
 Vijayaditya I (1138–1175 CE)
 Bhoja II (1175–1212 CE)

Ayudha dynasty of Kannauj (c. 770–810 CE)

Vajrayudha (770–783), founder of dynasty
Indrayudha
Chakrayudha (until 810)

Chandela dynasty of Jejakabhukti (c. 831–1315 CE)

The Chandelas of Jejakabhukti were a dynasty in Central India. They ruled much of the Bundelkhand region (then called Jejakabhukti) between the 9th and the 13th centuries.

Based on epigraphic records, the historians have come up with the following list of Chandela rulers of Jejākabhukti (IAST names in brackets):

 Nannuka, (c. 831-845 CE)
 Vakpati (Vākpati), (c. 845-865 CE)
 Jayashakti (Jayaśakti) and Vijayashakti (Vijayaśakti), (c. 865-885 CE)
 Rahila (Rāhila), (c. 885-905 CE)
 Shri Harsha (Śri Harśa),  (c. 905-925 CE)
 Yasho-Varman (Yaśovarman), (c. 925-950 CE)
 Dhanga-Deva (Dhaṅgadeva), (c. 950-999 CE)
 Ganda-Deva (Gaṇḍadeva), (c. 999-1002 CE)
 Vidyadhara (Vidyādhara), (c. 1003-1035 CE)
 Vijaya-Pala (Vijayapāla), (c. 1035-1050 CE)
 Deva-Varman, (c. 1050-1060 CE)
 Kirtti-Varman (Kīrtivarman), (c. 1060-1100 CE)
 Sallakshana-Varman (Sallakṣaṇavarman), (c. 1100-1110 CE)
 Jaya-Varman, (c. 1110-1120 CE)
 Prithvi-Varman (Pṛthvīvarman), (c. 1120-1128 CE)
 Madana-Varman, (c. 1128-1165 CE) 
 Yasho-Varman II (c. 1164-65 CE); did not rule or ruled for a very short time
 Paramardi-Deva, (c. 1165-1203 CE) 
 Trailokya-Varman, (c. 1203-1245 CE) 
 Vira-Varman (Vīravarman), (c. 1245-1285 CE) 
 Bhoja-Varman, (c. 1285-1288 CE)
 Hammira-Varman (Hammīravarman), (c. 1288-1311 CE)
 Vira-Varman II (c. 1311–1315 CE) (an obscure ruler with low titles, attested by only one 1315 CE inscription)

Seuna (Yadava) dynasty of Devagiri (c. 850–1334 CE)

 Dridhaprahara
 Seunachandra (850–874)
 Dhadiyappa (874–900)
 Bhillama I (900–925)
 Vadugi (Vaddiga) (950–974)
 Dhadiyappa II (974–975)
 Bhillama II (975–1005)
 Vesugi I (1005–1020)
 Bhillama III (1020–1055)
 Vesugi II (1055–1068)
 Bhillama III (1068)
 Seunachandra II (1068–1085)
 Airamadeva (1085–1115)
 Singhana I (1115–1145)
 Mallugi I (1145–1150)
 Amaragangeyya (1150–1160)
 Govindaraja (1160)
 Amara Mallugi II (1160–1165)
 Kaliya Ballala (1165–1173)
 Bhillama V (1173–1192), proclaimed independence from Kalyani Chalukya
 Jaitugi I (1192–1200)
 Singhana II (1200–1247)
 Kannara (1247–1261)
 Mahadeva (1261–1271)
 Amana (1271)
 Ramachandra (1271–1312)
 Singhana III (1312–1313)
 Harapaladeva (1313–1318)
 Mallugi III (1318–1334)

Paramara dynasty of Malwa (c. 9th century to 1305 CE) 

According to historical 'Kailash Chand Jain', "Knowledge of the early Paramara rulers from Upendra to Vairisimha is scanty; there are no records, and they are known only from later sources."
The Paramara rulers mentioned in the various inscriptions and literary sources include:

After death of Mahalakadeva in 1305 CE, Paramara dynasty rule was ended in Malwa region, but not in other Parmar states.

Utpala dynasty of Kashmir (c. 855 – 1009 CE) 

Didda (c. 980 – 1003 CE) placed Samgrāmarāja, son of her brother on the throne, who became founder of the Lohara dynasty.

Somavamshi dynasty (c. 882 – 1110 CE) 

Historian Krishna Chandra Panigrahi provides the following chronology of the later Somavamshis:

Pala dynasty of Kamarupa (c. 900 – 1100 CE)

Paramara dynasty of Chandravati (Abu) (c. 910 – 1220 CE) 

The following is a list of Paramara rulers of Chandravati, with approximate regnal years, as estimated by epigraphist H. V. Trivedi. The rulers are sons of their predecessors unless noted otherwise:

Kingdom of Ladakh (c. 930 – 1842 CE)

Maryul dynasty of Ngari (c. 930 – 1460 CE) 

Known Maryul rulers are-
Lhachen Palgyigon (c. 930 CE)
Lhachen Utpala (c. 1110 CE)

Namgyal dynasty (Gyalpo of Ladakh) (c. 1460 – 1842 CE) 

The kings of the Namgyal dynasty along with their periods of reign are as follows:
Lhachen Bhagan (c. 1460–1485)
Unknown ruler (c. 1485–1510)
Lata Jughdan (c. 1510–1535)
Kunga Namgyal I (c. 1535–1555)
Tashi Namgyal (c. 1555–1575)
Tsewang Namgyal I (c. 1575–1595) 
Namgyal Gonpo (c.1595–1600)
Jamyang Namgyal (c. 1595–1616)
Sengge Namgyal (first rule, c. 1616–1623)
Norbu Namgyal (c. 1623–1624)
Sengge Namgyal (second rule, c. 1624–1642)
Deldan Namgyal (c. 1642–1694)
Delek Namgyal (c. 1680–1691)
Nyima Namgyal (c. 1694–1729)
Deskyong Namgyal (c. 1729–1739)
Phuntsog Namgyal (c. 1739–1753)
Tsewang Namgyal II (c. 1753–1782)
Tseten Namgyal  (c. 1782–1802)
Tsepal Dondup Namgyal (c. 1802–1837, 1839–1840)
Kunga Namgyal II (c. 1840–1842)

Later Ladakh was conquered by Sikh Empire in 1842 CE.

Solanki dynasty (Chaulukyas of Gujarat) (c. 940–1244 CE)

The Chalukya rulers of Gujarat, with approximate dates of reign, are as follows:

 Mularaja
 Chamundaraja
 Vallabharaja
 Durlabharaja
 Bhima I
 Karna
 Jayasimha Siddharaja
 Kumarapala
 Ajayapala
 Mularaja II
 Bhima II
 Tribhuvanapala

Kachchhapaghata dynasty (c. 950–1150 CE)

Simhapaniya (Sihoniya) and Gopadri (Gwalior) branch

 Lakshmana (r. c. 950–975), first ruler of dynasty
 Vajradaman (r. c. 975–1000)
 Mangalaraja (r. c. 1000–1015)
 Kirtiraja (r. c. 1015–1035)
 Muladeva (r. c. 1035–1055)
 Devapala (r. c. 1055–1085)
 Padmapala (r. c. 1085–1090)
 Mahipala (r. c. 1090–1105)
 Ratnapala (r. c. 1105–1130)
 Ajayapala (r. c. 1192–1194)
 Sulakshanapala (r. c. 1196)

Dubkund (Dobha) branch

 Yuvaraja (r. c. 1000)
 Arjuna (r. c. 1015–1035)
 Abhimanyu (r. c. 1035–1045)
 Vijayapala (r. c. 1045–1070)
 Vikramasimha (r. c. 1070–1100)

Nalapura (Narwar) branch

 Gaganasimha (r. c. 1075–1090)
 Sharadasimha (r. c. 1090–1105)
 Virasimha (r. c. 1105–1125)
 Tejaskarana (r. c. 1125–1150), last ruler of dynasty

Kachwaha dynasty (c. 966–1949 CE)

Kachwahas King Sorha Dev and Dulha Rao defeated Meena of Dhundhar kingdom & established Kachwaha dynasty, which ruled for more than 1000 years & still ruling in Jaipur district of Rajasthan.

Rulers

 27 Dec 966 – 15 Dec 1006 Sorha Dev (d. 1006)
 15 Dec 1006 – 28 Nov 1036 Dulha Rao (d. 1036)
 28 Nov 1036 – 20 Apr 1039 Kakil (d. 1039)
 21 Apr 1039 – 28 Oct 1053 Hanu (d. 1053)
 28 Oct 1053 – 21 Mar 1070 Janddeo (d. 1070)
 22 Mar 1070 – 20 May 1094 Pajjun Rai (d. 1094)
 20 May 1094 – 15 Feb 1146 Malayasi (d. 1146)
 15 Feb 1146 – 25 Jul 1179 Vijaldeo (d. 1179)
 25 Jul 1179 – 16 Dec 1216 Rajdeo (d. 1216)
 16 Dec 1216 – 18 Oct 1276 Kilhan (d. 1276)
 18 Oct 1276 – 23 Jan 1317 Kuntal (d. 1317)
 23 Jan 1317 – 6 Nov 1366 Jonsi (d. 1366)
 6 Nov 1366 – 11 Feb 1388 Udaikarn (d. 1388)
 11 Feb 1388 – 16 Aug 1428 Narsingh (d. 1428)
 16 Aug 1428 – 20 Sep 1439 Banbir (d. 1439)
 20 Sep 1439 – 10 Dec 1467 Udharn (d. 1467)
 10 Dec 1467 – 17 Jan 1503 Chandrasen (d. 1503)
 17 Jan 1503 – 4 Nov 1527 Prithviraj Singh I (d. 1527)
 5 Nov 1527 – 19 Jan 1534 Puranmal (d. 1534)
 19 Jan 1534 – 22 Jul 1537 Bhim Singh (d. 1537)
 22 Jul 1537 – 15 May 1548 Ratan Singh (d. 1548)
 15 May 1548 – 1 June 1548 Askaran (d. 1599)
 1 Jun 1548 – 27 Jan 1574 Bharmal (d. 1574)
 27 Jan 1574 – 4 Dec 1589 Bhagwant Das (b. 1527 – d. 1589)
 4 Dec 1589 – 6 Jul 1614 Man Singh (b. 1550 – d. 1614)
 6 Jul 1614 – 13 Dec 1621 Bhau Singh (d. 1621)
 13 Dec 1621 – 28 Aug 1667 Jai Singh I (b. 1611 – d. 1667)
 10 Sep 1667 – 30 Apr 1688: Ram Singh I (b. 1640 – d. 1688)
 30 Apr 1688 – 19 Dec 1699: Bishan Singh (b. 1672 – d. 1699)
 19 Dec 1699 – 21 Sep 1743: Jai Singh II (b. 1688 – d. 1743)
 1743 – 12 Dec 1750: Ishwari Singh (b. 1721 – d. 1750)
 Dec 1750 – 6 Mar 1768: Madho Singh I (b. 1728 – d. 1768)
 7 Mar 1768 – 16 Apr 1778: Prithvi Singh II
 1778 – 1803: Pratap Singh (b. 1764 – d. 1803)
 1803 – 21 Nov 1818: Jagat Singh II (b. ... – d. 1818)
 22 Dec 1818 – 25 Apr 1819: Mohan Singh (regent) (b. 1809 – d. ...)
 25 Apr 1819 –  6 Feb 1835: Jai Singh III (b. 1819 – d. 1835)
 Feb 1835 – 18 Sep 1880: Ram Singh II (b. 1835 – d. 1880)
 18 Sep 1880 –  7 Sep 1922: Madho Singh II (b. 1861 – d. 1922)
 7 Sep 1922 – 15 Aug 1947 (subsidiary): Sawai Man Singh II (b. 1912 – d. 1970)
 15 Aug 1947 – 7 Apr 1949 (independent): Sawai Man Singh II (b. 1912 – d. 1970)
He was the last ruler of Kachawa dynasty, he annexed Jaipur State with Union of India in 1949 CE.

Titular rulers

 7 Apr 1949 – 24 Jun 1970: Sawai Man Singh II
 24 Jun 1970 – 28 Dec 1971: Sawai Bhawani Singh (b. 1931 – d. 2011)
Titles were abolished in 1971 according to the 26th amendment to the Indian Constitution.
 28 Dec 1971 – 17 Apr 2011: Sawai Bhawani Singh (b. 1931 – d. 2011)
17 Apr 2011 – present: Padmanabh Singh (b. 1998)

Hoysala Empire (c. 1000–1343 CE)

 Nripa Kama (1000–1045)

Lohara dynasty of Kashmir (c. 1003–1320 CE)

The Lohara dynasty were Hindu rulers of Kashmir from the Khasa tribe, in the northern part of the Indian subcontinent, between 1003 and approximately 1320 CE. The dynasty was founded by the Samgramaraja, the grandson of Khasha chief Simharaja and the nephew of the Utpala dynasty Queen Didda.

First Lohara dynasty

Second Lohara dynasty

Khasa Malla Kingdom (c. 10th to 14th century CE) 

The list of Khas Malla kings mentioned by Giuseppe Tucci is in the following succession up to Prithvi Malla:

List–
 Nāgarāja, (first known ruler of dynasty)
 Chaap/Cāpa
 Chapilla/Cāpilla
 Krashichalla
 Kradhichalla
 Krachalla Deva (1207–1223 CE)
 Ashoka Challa (1223–1287)
 Jitari Malla
 Ananda Malla
 Ripu Malla (1312–1313)
 Sangrama Malla
 Aditya Malla
 Kalyana Malla
 Pratapa Malla
 Punya Malla
 Prithvi Malla
 Abhaya Malla (14th century), (last ruler of dynasty)

Naga dynasty of Kalahandi (1005 – 1947 CE) 

Imperial rulers
Raghunath Sai (1005–1040)
Pratap Narayan Deo (1040–1072)
Birabar Deo (1072–1108)
Jugasai Deo I (1108–1142)
Udenarayan Deo (1142–1173)
Harichandra Deo (1173–1201)
Ramachandra Deo (1201–1234)
Gopinath Deo (1234–1271)
Balabhadra Deo (1271–1306
Raghuraj Deo (1306–1337)
Rai Singh Deo I (1337–1366)
Haria Deo (1366–1400)
Jugasai Deo II (1400–1436)
Pratap Narayan Deo II (1436–1468)
Hari Rudra Deo (1468–1496)
Anku Deo (1496–1528)
Pratap Deo (1528–1564)
Raghunath Deo (1564–1594)
Biswambhar Deo (1594–1627)
Rai Singh Deo II (1627–1658)
Dusmant Deo (1658–1693)
Jugasai Deo III (1693–1721)
Khadag Rai Deo (1721–1747)
Rai Singh Deo III (1747–1771)
Purusottam Deo (1771–1796)
Jugasai Dei IV (1796–1831)
Fateh Narayan Deo (1831–1853)
Udit Pratap Deo I (1853–1881)
Raghu Keshari De (1894–1897)
Court of Wards (1897–1917)
Brajamohan Deo (1917–1939)
Pratap Keshari Deo (1939–1947)

Titular rulers

Pratap Keshari Deo (1948 – 8 October 2001)
Udit Pratap Deo II (8 October 2001 – 2 November 2019)
Anant Pratap Deo (2 November 2019 – current)

Sena dynasty of Bengal (1070 – 1230 CE)

Kakatiya dynasty (1083–1323)

 Beta I (1000–1030)
 Prola I (1030–1075)
 Beta II (1075–1110)
 Prola II (1110–1158)
 Prataparudra I/Rudradeva I (1158–1195).[First independent ruler of this dynasty]
 Mahadeva (1195–1198).[Brother of King Rudradeva]
 Ganapati deva (1199–1261)[He changed capital from Hanumakonda to Orugallu(present day warangal)]
 Rudrama Devi (1262–1296)[Only woman ruler of this dynasty]
 Prataparudra II/ Rudradeva II (1296–1323). [Grandson of Queen Rudrama and last ruler of this dynasty]

Gahadavala dynasty (1089–1197 CE)

List of rulers–
 Chandradeva (c. 1089–1103 CE), founder of dynasty
 Madanapala (c. 1104–1113 CE)
 Govindachandra (c. 1114–1155 CE
 Vijayachandra (c. 1155–1169 CE), alias Vijayapala or Malladeva
 Jayachandra (c. 1170–1194 CE), called Jaichand in vernacular legends
 Harishchandra (c. 1194–1197 CE), last ruler of dynasty

Karnata dynasty of Mithila (1097 – 1324 CE)

List of rulers–

Zamorin dynasty of Calicut (1124–1806 CE)

List of rulers–

Jadeja Kingdom of Kutch (1147 – 1948 CE) 

Cutch was ruled by the Jadeja Rajput dynasty of the Samma tribe from its formation in 1147 CE until 1948 CE when it acceded to newly formed, India. The Jadeja Rajputs had migrated from Sindh into Kutch in late 12th century and started their kingdom.

Bhati kingdom of Jaisalmer (c. 1153–1947 CE)

Rawals 

Rawal Jaisal Singh
(1153–1168),  founder of kingdom
Rawal Shalivahan Singh II (1168–1200)
Rawal Baijal Singh (1200–1200)
Rawal Kailan Singh (1200–1219)
Rawal Chachak Deo Singh (1219–1241)
Rawal Karan Singh I (1241–1271)
Rawal Lakhan Sen (1271–1275)
Rawal Punpal Singh (1275–1276)
Rawal Jaitsi Singh I (1276–1294)
Rawal Mulraj Singh I (1294–1295)
Rawal Durjan Sal (Duda) (1295–1306)
Rawal Gharsi Singh (1306–1335)
Rawal Kehar Singh II (1335–1402)
Rawal Lachhman Singh (1402–1436)
Rawal Bersi Singh (1436–1448)
Rawal Chachak Deo Singh II (1448–1457)
Rawal Devidas Singh (1457–1497)
Rawal Jaitsi Singh II (1497–1530)
Rawal Karan Singh II (1530–1530)
Rawal Lunkaran Singh (1530–1551)
Rawal Maldev Singh (1551–1562)
Rawal Harraj Singh (1562–1578)
Rawal Bhim Singh (1578–1624)
Rawal Kalyan Singh (1624–1634)
Rawal Manohar Das Singh (1634–1648)
Rawal Ram-Chandra Singh (1648–1651)
Rawal Sabal Singh (1651–1661)

Maharawals 

Maharawal Amar Singh of Jaisalmer (1661–1702)
Maharawal Jaswant Singh of Jaisalmer (1702–1708)
Maharawal Budh Singh (1708–1722)
Maharawal Akhi Singh (1722–1762)
Maharawal Mulraj II (1762–1820)
Maharawal Gaj Singh (1820–1846)
Maharawal Ranjit Singh of Jaisalmer (1846–1864)
Maharawal Bairi Sal (1864–1891)
Maharawal Shalivahan Singh III (1891 –1914)
Maharawal Jawahir Singh (1914–1947)

Titular Kings 

 Girdhar Singh (1949–1950)
 Raghunath Singh (1950–1982)
 Brijraj Singh (1982–2020)
 Chaitanya Raj Singh (2020–Till Present)

Chero dynasty (1174–1813 CE)

Ghughulia (1174 CE), founder of dynasty
Raja Ramchandar Rai 
Raja Sita Ram Rai
Raja Salabahim
Raja Phulchand
Raja Maharata Rai
Raja Kumkum Chand Rai
Raja Sambhal Rai
Raja Bhagwant Rai (1585–1605)
Raja Anant Rai (1605–1612)
Raja Shambhal Rai (1612–1627)
Raja Bhupal Rai (1637–1657)
Maharaja Medini Rai (1658–1674)
Raja Pratap Rai 
Raja Rudra Rai (1674–1680)
Raja Dikpal Rai (1680–1697)
Raja Saheb Rai (1697–1716)
Raja Ranjit Rai (1716–1722)
Raja Devi Batesh Rai 
Raja Jai Kishan Rai (1722–1770)
Raja Chitrajeet Rai (1771–1771)
Raja Gopal Rai (1771–1776)
Raja Gajraj Rai (1777–1780) 
Raja Basant Rai (1780–1783)
Raja Churaman Rai (1783–1813), last ruler of dynasty

Chutia (Sadiya) Kingdom of Assam (1187–1524 CE)

 Birpal (1187–1224), founder of dynasty
 Ratnadhwajpal	(1224–1250)
 Vijayadhwajpal (1250–1278)
 Vikramadhwajpal (1278–1302)
 Gauradhwajpal	(1302–1322)
 Sankhadhwajpal (1322–1343)
 Mayuradhwajpal (1343–1361)
 Jayadhwajpal (1361–1383)
 Karmadhwajpal	(1383–1401)
 Satyanarayan (1401–1421)
 Laksminarayan	(1421–1439)
 Dharmanarayan	(1439–1458)
 Pratyashnarayan (1458–1480)
 Purnadhabnarayan (1480–1502)
 Dharmadhajpal	(1502–1522)
 Nitypal (1522–1524), last ruler of dynasty

Bana dynasty ruled over Magadaimandalam (c. 1190–1260)

Kadava dynasty (c. 1216–1279)

 Kopperunchinga I (c. 1216–1242)
 Kopperunchinga II (c. 1243–1279)

Kingdom of Marwar (1226–1950)

Rathore dynasty of Jodhpur

Rulers from Pali & Mandore (1226–1438)

Rulers from Jodhpur (1459–1950)

Delhi Sultanate (1206–1526 CE)

Mamluk dynasty (1206–1290 CE)

 Qutb-ud-din Aibak (1206–1210)
 Aram Shah (1210–1211)
 Shams-ud-din Iltutmish (1211–1236)
 Rukn-ud-din Firuz (1236)
 Raziyyat ud din Sultana (1236–1240)
 Muiz-ud-din Bahram (1240–1242)
 Ala-ud-din Masud (1242–1246)
 Nasir-ud-din Mahmud (1246–1266)
 Ghiyas-ud-din Balban (1266–1286)
 Muiz-ud-din Qaiqabad (1286–1290)

Khalji dynasty (1290–1320 CE)

 Jalal ud din Firuz Khilji (1290–1296)
 Alauddin Khilji (1296–1316)
 Shihabuddin Omar Khan Khilji (1316)
 Qutb ud din Mubarak Shah Khilji (1316–1320)
 Khusro Khan khilji (1320)

Tughlaq dynasty (1321–1414 CE)

 Ghiyas ud din Tughluq (1321–1325)
 Muhammad Shah Tughuluq I (1325–1351)
 Firuz Shah Tughluq (1351–1388)
 Ghiyas-ud-Din Tughluq II (1388–1389)
 Abu Bakr Shah (1389–1390)
 Muhammad Shah Tughluq III (1390–1394)
 Ala ud-din Sikandar Shah Tughluq (1394)
 Muhammad Shah Tughuluq IV (1394–1413)

After the invasion of Timur in 1398, the governor of Multan, Khizr Khan abolished the Tughluq dynasty in 1414.

Jaunpur Sultanate (1394–1479 CE)

 Malik Sarwar Shah (1394–1399)
 Mubarak Shah (1399–1402)
 Ibrahim Shah (1402–1440)
 Mahmud Shah	(1440–1457)
 Muhammad Shah (1457–1458)
 Hussain Shah (1458–1479)

Sayyid dynasty (1414–1451 CE)

 Khizr Khan (1414–1421)
 Mubarak Shah (1421–1434)
 Muhammad Shah (1434–1445)
 Alam Shah (1445–1451)

Lodi dynasty (1451–1526 CE)

 Bahlol Khan Lodi (1451–1489)
 Sikandar Lodi (1489–1517)
 Ibrahim Lodi (1517–1526), defeated by Babur (who replaced the Delhi Sultanate with the Mughal Empire)

Ahom dynasty of Assam (1228–1826 CE)

Vaghela dynasty (1244–1304 CE)

The sovereign Vaghela rulers include:
Visala-deva (1244–1262), founder of the dynasty
Arjuna-deva (1262–1275), son of Pratapamalla
Rama (1275), son of Arjunadeva
Saranga-deva (1275–1296), son of Arjunadeva
Karna-deva (1296–1304), son of Rama; also called Karna II to distinguish him from Karna Chaulukya.

Jaffna (Aryachakravarti) dynasty (1277–1619 CE)

List of rulers–
 Kulasekara Cinkaiariyan(1277–1284), founder of dynasty
 Kulotunga Cinkaiariyan (1284–1292)
 Vickrama Cinkaiariyan (1292–1302)
 Varodaya Cinkaiariyan (1302–1325)
 Martanda Cinkaiariyan (1325–1348)
 Gunabhooshana Cinkaiariyan (1348–1371)
 Virodaya Cinkaiariyan (1371–1380)
 Jeyaveera Cinkaiariyan (1380–1410)
 Gunaveera Cinkaiariyan (1410–1440)
 Kanakasooriya Cinkaiariyan (1440–1450 & 1467–1478)
 Singai Pararasasegaram (1478–1519)
 Cankili I (1519–1561)
 Puviraja Pandaram (1561–1565 & 1582–1591)
 Kasi Nayinar Pararacacekaran (1565–1570)
 Periyapillai (1565–1582)
 Ethirimana Cinkam (1591–1617)
 Cankili II Cekaracacekaran (1617–1619), last ruler of dynasty

Kingdom of Tripura (1280–1949 CE)

Manikya dynasty

List of rulers–
 Ratna Manikya (1280 CE)
 Pratap Manikya (1350 CE)
 Mukul Manikya (1400 CE)

On 9 September 1949, "Tripura Merger Agreement", was signed and come in effect from 15 October 1949 & Tripura became part of Indian Union.

Nayaka Kingdoms (c. 1325–1815 CE)

The Nayakas were originally military governors under the Vijayanagara Empire. It is unknown, in fact, if these founded dynasties were related, being branches of a major family, or if they were completely different families. Historians tend to group them by location.

Nayaka dynasty

Vellore Nayaka Kingdom (c. 1540–1601 CE)

The list of nayaks are unclear. Some of the Nayaks are:

Chinna Bommi Reddy
Thimma Reddy Nayak
Lingama Nayak

Other Nayaka kingdoms

 Nayakas of Shorapur
 Nayakas of Kalahasti
 Nayakas of Harappanahalli
 Nayakas of Gummanayakana Palya
 Nayakas of Kuppam
 Nayakas of Rayalaseema
 Nayakas of Jarimale
 Nayakas of Gudekote
 Nayakas of Nayakanahatti

Reddy Kingdom (1325–1448 CE)

List of rulers–
 Prolaya Vema Reddy (1325–1335), founder of dynasty
 Anavota Reddy (1335–1364)
 Anavema Reddy (1364–1386)
 Kumaragiri Reddy (1386–1402)
 Kataya Vema Reddy (1395–1414)
 Allada Reddy (1414–1423)
 Veerabhadra Reddy	(1423–1448), last ruler of dynasty

Oiniwar (Sugauna) dynasty of Mithila (1325–1526 CE)

List of rulers–
According to historian Makhan Jha, the rulers of the Oiniwar dynasty are as follows:
 
 Nath Thakur, founder of dynasty in 1325 CE
 Atirupa Thakur
 Vishwarupa Thakur
 Govinda Thakur
 Lakshman Thakur
 Kameshwar Thakur
 Bhogishwar Thakur, ruled for over 33 years
 Ganeshwar Singh, reigned from 1355; killed by his cousins in 1371 after a long-running internecine dispute
 Kirti Singh
 Bhava Singh Deva
 Deva Simha Singh
 Shiva Simha Singh (or Shivasimha Rūpanārāyana), took power in 1402, missing in battle in 1406
 Lakshima Devi, chief wife of Shiva Simha Singh, ruled as regent for 12 years. She committed sati after many years of waiting for her husband's return.
 Padma Simha Singh, took power in 1418 and died in 1431
 Viswavasa Devi, wife of Padma Singh, died in 1443
 Hara Singh Deva, younger brother of Deva Singh
 Nara Singh Deva, died in 1460
 Dhir Singh Deva
 Bhairva Singh Deva, died in 1515, brother of Dhir Singh Deva
 Rambhadra Deva
 Laxminath Singh Deva, last ruler died in 1526 CE

Vijayanagara Empire (1336 – 1646 CE) 

Vijayanagara Empire was ruled by four different dynasties for about 310 years on entire South India.

Bahmani Sultanate (1347–1527 CE)

 Ala-ud-Din Bahman Mohamed bin Laden Shah (1347–1358)
 Muhammad Shah I (1358–1375)
 Ala ud din Mujahid Shah (1375–1378)
 Daud Shah I (1378)
 Muhammad Shah II (1378–1397)
 Ghiyas ud din Tahmatan Shah (1397)
 Shams ud din Daud Shah II (1397)
 Taj ud-Din Firuz Shah (1397–1422)
 Ahmad Shah I Wali (1422–1435), established his capital at Bidar
 Ala ud din Ahmad Shah II (1436–1458)
 Ala ud din Humayun Shah (1458–1461)
 Nizam-Ud-Din Ahmad III (1461–1463)
 Muhammad Shah III Lashkari (1463–1482)
 Mahmood Shah Bahmani II(1482–1518)
 Ahmad Shah IV (1518–1521)
 Ala ud din Shah (1521–1522)
 Waliullah Shah (1522–1524)
 Kalimullah Shah (1524–1527)

Malwa Sultanate (1392–1562 CE)

Ghoris (1390–1436 CE)
 Dilavar Khan Husain (1390–1405)
 Alp Khan Hushang (1405–1435)
Ghazni Khan Muhammad (1435–1436)
 Masud Khan (1436)

Khaljis (1436–1535 CE)
 Mahmud Shah I (1436–1469)
 Ghiyath Shah (1469–1500)
 Nasr Shah (1500–1511)
 Mahmud Shah II (1511–1530)

Patna Kingdom (1360–1948 CE)

The rulers of Patna state of the Chauhan clan:

Ramai Deva (1360–1380), founder of dynasty
Mahalinga Deva (1380–1385)
Vatsaraja Deva (1385–1410)
Vaijala Deva I (1410–1430)
Bhojaraj Deva (1430–1455)
Pratap Rudra Deva I (1455–1480)
Bhupal Deva I (1480–1500)
Vikramaditya Deva I (1500–1520)
Vaijal Deva II (1520–1540)
Bajra Hiradhara Deva (1540–1570)
Narsingh Deva (1570–1577)
Hamir Deva (1577–1581)
Pratap Deva II (1581–1620)
Vikramaditya Deva II (1620–1640)
Mukunda Deva (1640–1670)
Balaram Deva (1670–1678)
Hrdesha Deva (1678–1685)
Rai Singh Deva (1685–1762)
Prithviraj Deva (1762–1765)
Ramchandra Singh Deo I (1765–1820)
Bhupal Singh Deo (1820–1848)
Hiravajra Singh Deo (1848–1866)
Pratap Singh Deo (1866–25 November 1878)
Ramchandra Singh Deo II (25 November 1878 – 1895)
Lal Dalganjan Singh Deo (1895–1910)
Prithviraj Singh (1910–1924)
Rajendra Narayan Singh Deo (1924–1 January 1948), last official ruler of dynasty & merge kingdom in India in 1948 CE.

Baro-Bhuyan kingdoms (1365–1632 CE)

List of Kingdoms and their rulers as–

Baro-Bhuyan of Assam (1365–1440 CE)

 Sasanka (Arimatta) (1365–1385 CE)
 Gajanka (1385–1400 CE)
 Sukranka (1400–1415 CE)
 Mriganka (1415–1440 CE)

Baro-Bhuyan of Bengal (1576–1632 CE)

Isa Khan
Musa Khan (Bengal Ruler)
Masum Khan

Tomara dynasty of Gwalior (1375–1523 CE) 

The Tomara rulers of Gwalior include the following.

Kingdom of Mysore (1399–1950 CE)

Wadiyar dynasty
 Yaduraya Wodeyar or Raja Vijaya Raj Wodeyar (1399–1423 CE)
 Hiriya Bettada Chamaraja Wodeyar I (1423–1459 CE)
 Thimmaraja Wodeyar I (1459–1478 CE)
 Hiriya Chamaraja Wodeyar II (1478–1513 CE)
 Hiriya bettada Chamaraja Wodeyar III (1513–1553 CE)
 Thimmaraja Wodeyar II (1553–1572 CE)
 Bola Chamaraja Wodeyar IV (1572–1576 CE)
 Bettada Devaraja Wodeyar (1576–1578 CE)
 Raja Wodeyar I (1578–1617 CE)
 Chamaraja Wodeyar V (1617–1637 CE)
 Raja Wodeyar II (1637–1638 CE)
 Ranadhira Kantheerava Narasaraja Wodeyar I (1638–1659 CE)
 Dodda Devaraja Wodeyar (1659–1673 CE)
 Chikka Devaraja Wodeyar (1673–1704 CE)
 Kantheerava Narasaraja Wodeyar II (1704–1714 CE)
 Dodda Krishnaraja Wodeyar I (1714–1732 CE)
 Chamaraja Wodeyar VI (1732–1734 CE)
 Immadi Krishnaraja Wodeyar II (1734–1766 CE), ruled under Hyder Ali from 1761 CE
 Nanajaraja Wodeyar (1766–1772 CE), ruled under Hyder Ali
 Bettada Chamaraja Wodeyar VII (1772–1776 CE), ruled under Hyder Ali
 Khasa Chamaraja Wodeyar VIII (1776–1796 CE), ruled under Hyder Ali until 1782 CE, then under Tipu Sultan until his deposition in 1796 CE.
 Hyder Ali (1761–1782 CE), usurper and non-dynastic
 Tipu Sultan (1782–1799 CE), son of the previous.
 Mummudi Krishnaraja Wodeyar III (1799–1868 CE), Wodeyar dynasty restored
 Chamaraja Wodeyar IX (1868–1894 CE)
 Vani Vilas Sannidhana, queen of Chamaraja Wodeyar IX served as regent from (1894 to 1902 CE)
 Nalvadi Krishnaraja Wodeyar IV (1894–1940 CE)
 Jayachamaraja Wodeyar Bahadur (1940–1950 CE)

Gajapati Empire (1434 – 1541 CE) 

Rulers–

Rathore dynasty of Bikaner (1465 – 1947 CE) 

Rulers–

Shahi dynasties (1490–1686 CE)
Dynasties are as follow–

Barid Shahi dynasty (1490–1619 CE)

 Qasim Barid I 1490–1504
 Amir Barid I 1504–1542
 Ali Barid Shah I 1542–1580
 Ibrahim Barid Shah 1580–1587
 Qasim Barid Shah II 1587–1591
 Ali Barid Shah II 1591
 Amir Barid Shah II 1591–1601
 Mirza Ali Barid Shah III 1601–1609
 Amir Barid Shah III 1609–1619

Imad Shahi dynasty (1490–1572 CE)

 Fathullah Imad-ul-Mulk (1490–1504)
 Aladdin Imad Shah (1504–1530)
 Darya Imad Shah (1530–1562)
 Burhan Imad Shah (1562–1574)
 Tufal Khan 1574

Adil Shahi dynasty (1490–1686 CE)

 Yusuf Adil Shah (1490–1511)
 Ismail Adil Shah (1511–1534)
 Mallu Adil Shah (1534) 
 Ibrahim Adil Shah I (1534–1558)
 Ali Adil Shah I (1558–1579) 
 Ibrahim Adil Shah II (1580–1627) 
 Mohammed Adil Shah, Sultan of Bijapur (1627–1657)
 Ali Adil Shah II (1657–1672)
 Sikandar Adil Shah (1672–1686)

Nizam Shahi dynasty (1490–1636 CE)

 Malik Ahmad Nizam Shah I 1490–1510
 Burhan Nizam Shah I 1510–1553
 Hussain Nizam Shah I 1553–1565
 Murtaza Nizam Shah I 1565–1588
 Hussain Nizam Shah II 1588–1589
 Ismail Nizam Shah 1589–1591
 Burhan Nizam Shah II 1591–1595
 Ibrahim Nizam Shah 1595–1596
 Malik Ahmad Nizam Shah II 1596
 Bahadur Nizam Shah 1596–1600
 Murtaza Nizam Shah II 1600–1610
 Burhan Nizam Shah III 1610–1631
 Hussain Nizam Shah III 1631–1633
 Murtaza Nizam Shah III 1633–1636

Qutb Shahi dynasty (1518–1686 CE)

 Sultan Quli Qutbl Mulk (1518–1543)
 Jamsheed Quli Qutb Shah (1543–1550)
 Subhan Quli Qutb Shah (1550)
 Ibrahim Quli Qutub Shah (1550–1580)
 Muhammad Quli Qutb Shah (1580–1612)
 Sultan Muhammad Qutb Shah (1612–1626)
 Abdullah Qutb Shah (1626–1672)
 Abul Hasan Qutb Shah (1672–1686)

Gatti Mudalis of Taramangalam  (15th–17th century CE)

List of known rulers–
Vanagamudi Gatti
Immudi Gatti
Gatti Mudali

Kingdom of Cochin (c. 1503–1948 CE)

Veerakerala Varma, nephew of Cheraman Perumal Nayanar, is supposed to have been the first king of Cochin around the 7th century. But the records we have start in 1503.

 Unniraman Koyikal I (?–1503)
 Unniraman Koyikal II (1503–1537)
 Veera Kerala Varma (1537–1565)
 Keshava Rama Varma (1565–1601)
 Veera Kerala Varma (1601–1615)
 Ravi Varma I (1615–1624)
 Veera Kerala Varma (1624–1637)
 Godavarma (1637–1645)
 Veerarayira Varma (1645–1646)
 Veera Kerala Varma (1646–1650)
 Rama Varma I (1650–1656)
 Rani Gangadharalakshmi (1656–1658)
 Rama Varma II (1658–1662)
 Goda Varma (1662–1663)
 Veera Kerala Varma (1663–1687)
 Rama Varma III (1687–1693)
 Ravi Varma II (1693–1697)
 Rama Varma IV (1697–1701)
 Rama Varma V (1701–1721)
 Ravi Varma III (1721–1731)
 Rama Varma VI (1731–1746)
 Veera Kerala Varma I (1746–1749)
 Rama Varma VII (1749–1760)
 Veera Kerala Varma II (1760–1775)
 Rama Varma VIII (1775–1790)
 Shaktan Thampuran (Rama Varma IX) (1790–1805)
 Rama Varma X (1805–1809), Vellarapalli-yil Theepetta Thampuran (King who died in "Vellarapali")
 Veera Kerala Varma III (1809–1828), Karkidaka Maasathil Theepetta Thampuran (King who died in "karkidaka" month (Kollam Era))
 Rama Varma XI (1828–1837), Thulam-Maasathil Theepett1a Thampuran (King who died in "Thulam" month (ME))
 Rama Varma XII (1837–1844), Edava-Maasathil Theepett1a Thampuran (King who died in "Edavam" month (ME))
 Rama Varma XIII (1844–1851), Thrishur-il Theepetta Thampuran (King who died in "Thrishivaperoor" or Thrishur)
 Veera Kerala Varma IV (1851–1853), Kashi-yil Theepetta Thampuran (King who died in "Kashi" or Varanasi)
 Ravi Varma IV (1853–1864), Makara Maasathil Theepetta Thampuran (King who died in "Makaram" month (ME))
 Rama Varma XIV (1864–1888), Mithuna Maasathil Theepetta Thampuran (King who died in "Mithunam" month (ME))
 Kerala Varma V (1888–1895), Chingam Maasathil Theepetta Thampuran (King who died in "Chingam" month (ME))
 Rama Varma XV (1895–1914), a.k.a. Rajarshi, abdicated (d. in 1932)
 Rama Varma XVI (1915–1932), Madrasil Theepetta Thampuran (King who died in Madras or Chennai)
 Rama Varma XVII (1932–1941), Dhaarmika Chakravarthi (King of Dharma), Chowara-yil Theepetta Thampuran (King who died in "Chowara")
 Kerala Varma VI (1941–1943), Midukkan (syn: Smart, expert, great) Thampuran
 Ravi Varma V (1943–1946), Kunjappan Thampuran (Brother of Midukkan Thampuran)
 Kerala Varma VII (1946–1948), Ikya-Keralam (Unified Kerala) Thampuran
 Rama Varma XVIII (1948–1964), Pareekshit Thampuran

Koch dynasty (c. 1515–1949 CE)

Rulers of undivided Koch kingdom (c. 1515–1586)
Biswa Singha (1515–1540)
Nara Narayan (1540–1586)

Rulers of Koch Bihar (c. 1586–1949)

 Lakshmi Narayan
 Bir Narayan
 Pran Narayan
 Basudev Narayan
 Mahindra Narayan
 Roop Narayan
 Upendra Narayan
 Devendra Narayan
 Dhairjendra Narayan
 Rajendra Narayan
 Dharendra Narayan
 Harendra Narayan
 Shivendra Narayan
 Narendra Narayan
 Nripendra Narayan
 Rajendra Narayan II
 Jitendra Narayan (father of Gayatri Devi)
 Jagaddipendra Narayan (ruled until 1949)

Rulers of Koch Hajo (c. 1581–1616 CE) 

 Raghudev (son of Chilarai, nephew of Nara Narayan)
 Parikshit Narayan

Rulers of Darrang 

 Balinarayan (brother of Parikshit Narayan)
 Mahendra Narayan
 Chandra Narayan
 Surya Narayan

Rulers of Beltola 

Gaj Narayan Dev (brother of Parikshit Narayan, ruler of Koch Hajo, brother of Balinarayan, first Koch ruler of Darrang).
Shivendra Narayan Dev (Son of Gaj Narayan)
Gandharva Narayan Dev (Son of Shivendra Narayan)
Uttam Narayan Dev (Son of Gandharva Narayan Dev)
Dhwaja Narayan Dev (Son of Uttam Narayan Dev)
Jay Narayan Dev (Son of Dhwaja Narayan Dev)
Lambodar Narayan Dev (Son of Jay Narayan Dev)
Lokpal Narayan Dev (Son of Lambodar Narayan Dev)
Amrit Narayan Dev (Son of Lokpal Narayan Dev)
Chandra Narayan Dev (Son of Lokpal Narayan Dev) (died 1910 CE)
Rajendra Narayan Dev (Son of Chandra Narayan Dev) (died 1937 CE)
Lakshmipriya Devi (wife of Rajendra Narayan Dev) (reign:1937–1947 CE died: 1991 CE)

Rulers of Bijni 
The Bijni rulers reigned between the Sankosh and the Manas rivers, the region immediately to the east of Koch Bihar.

 Chandra Narayan (son of Parikshit Narayan)
 Joy Narayan
 Shiv Narayan
 Bijoy Narayan
 Mukunda Narayan
 Haridev Narayan
 Balit Narayan
 Indra Narayan
 Amrit Narayan
 Kumud Narayan
 Jogendra Narayan
 Bhairabendra Narayan

Rulers of Khaspur 

The rulers of the Koch kingdom at Khaspur were:
 Kamal Narayan (Gohain Kamal, son of Biswa Singha, governor of Khaspur)
 Udita Narayan (declared independence of Khaspur in 1590)
 Vijay Narayana
 Dhir Narayana
 Mahendra Narayana
 Ranjit 
 Nara Singha
 Bhim Singha (his only issue, daughter Kanchani, married a prince of Kachari kingdom, and Khaspur merged with the Kachari kingdom)

Khandwala (Raj Darbhanga) dynasty of Mithila (1526–1947 CE) 

List of rulers–
  Raja Mahesh Thakur (Approx. 1526–1557)
  Raja Gopal Thakur (Approx. 1557–1600)
  Raja Parmanand Thakur (Approx. 1600–1607)
  Raja Purushottam Thakur (ruled 1607–1623)
  Raja Narayan Thakur (ruled 1623–1642).
  Raja Sundar Thakur (ruled 1642–1662)
  Raja Mahinath Thakur (ruled 1662–1684)
  Raja Nirpat Thakur (ruled 1684–1700)
  Raja Raghu Singh (ruled 1700–1736)
  Raja Bishnu Singh (ruled 1736–1740)
  Raja Narendra Singh (ruled 1740–1760)
  Raja Pratap Singh (ruled 1760–1776)
  Raja Madho Singh (ruled 1776–1808)
  Maharaja Chhatra Singh Bahadur (ruled 1808–1839)
  Maharaja Rudra Singh Bahadur (ruled 1839–1850)
  Maharaja Maheshwar Singh Bahadur (ruled 1850–1860)
 Maharaja Lakshmeshwar Singh Bahadur (ruled 1860–1898)
  Maharaja Rameshwar Singh Bahadur (ruled 1898–1929)
 Maharaja Kameshwar Singh Bahadur (ruled 1929–1947), last ruler of dynasty

Mughal Empire (1526–1857 CE)

 Babur (1526–1530), founder of the dynasty
 Humayun (1530–1540)
 Akbar (1556–1605)
 Jahangir (1605–1627)
 Shah Jahan (1627–1657)
 Aurangzeb (1658–1707)
Muhammad Azam Shah (1707)
 Bahadur Shah I (1707–1712)
 Jahandar Shah (1712–1713)
 Farrukh Siyar (1713–1719)
 Rafi ud Darajat (1719)
 Rafi ud Daulah (1719)
 Nikusiyar (1719)
 Muhammad Shah (first rule, 1719–1720)
 Muhammad Ibrahim (1720)
 Muhammad Shah (restored) (1720–1748)
 Ahmad Shah Bahadur (1748–1754)
 Alamgir II (1754–1759)
 Shah Jahan III (1760)
 Shah Alam II (1759–1806)
 Akbar Shah II (1806–1837)
 Bahadur Shah Zafar II (1837–1857), last of Mughals

Muslim vassals of the Mughal/British Paramountcy (1707 – 1856 CE)

Sur Empire (1540–1555 CE)

 Sher Shah (1540–1545), seized the Mughal Empire after defeating the second Mughal Emperor Humayun
 Islam Shah Suri (1545–1554)
 Firuz Shah Suri (1554)
 Muhammad Adil Shah (1554–1555)
 Ibrahim Shah Suri (1555)
 Sikandar Shah Suri (1554–1555)
 Adil Shah Suri (1555–1556), last ruler of dynasty

Bhoi dynasty (1541–1947 CE)

Gajapati of Odisha

 Govinda Vidyadhara (1541–1548), founder of dynasty
 Chakrapratapa (1548–1557)
 Narasimha Ray Jena (1557–1558)
 Raghuram Ray Chotaraya (1558–1560)

Khurda Kingdom

 Ramachandra Deva I (Abhinav Indradyumna) (1568–1600)
 Purusottam Deva (1600–1621)
 Narasingha Deva (1621–1647)
 Balabhadra Deva (1647–1657)
 Mukunda Deva I (1657–1689)
 Divyasingha Deva I (1689–1716)
 Harekrushna Deva (1716–1720)
 Gopinath Deva (1720–1727)
 Ramachandra Deva II (1727–1736)
 Birakesari Deva I (Bhagirathi Deva) (1736–1793)
 Divyasingha Deva II (1793–1798)
 Mukundeva Deva II (1798–1804)
Dhenkanal State

List of rulers of the Dhenkanal princely state of the Bhoi dynasty branch:

 Harisingh Vidyadhara (1530 -1594)
 Loknath Ray Singh Bharamarbar (1594 - 1615)
 Balabhadra Ray Singh (1615 - 1641)
 Nilakantha Ray Singh (1641 - 1682)
 Nrusingh Bhramarbar (1682 - 1708)
 Kunja Behari Bhramarbar (1708 - 1728)
 Braja Behari Bhramarbar (1728 - 1741)
 Damodar Bhramarbar (1741 - 1743)
 Trilochna Dev Mahendra Bahadur (1743 - 1785)
 Ramchandra Mahendra Bahadur (1796 - 1807)
 Krishna Chandra Mahendra Bahadur (1807 - 1822)
 Shyam Chandra Mahendra Bahadur (1822 - 1830)
 Bhagiratha Mahendra Bahadur (1830 - 1873)
 Pitambar Deo (1873 - 1877)
 Dinabandhu Mahendra Bahadur (1877 - 1885)
 Surya Pratap Mahendra Bahadur (1885 - 1918)
 Shankar Pratap Singh Dev Mahendra (1918 - 1948), from 1948 titular rulers were appointed but with no real power.
 Shankar Pratap Singh Dev Mahendra (1948 - 1965), titular
 Kamakhya Prasad Singh Deo (born 6 August 1941), titular

Puri Estate

 Mukundeva Deva II (1804–1817) (exiled and continued as Raja of Puri)
 Ramchandra Deva III (1817–1854)
 Birakesari Deva II (1854–1859)
 Divyasingha Deva III (1859–1882)
 Mukundeva Deva III (1882–1926)
 Ramchandra Deva IV (1926–1947), last official ruler of dynasty. From 1948 titular rulers were appointed but with no real power.
 Ramchandra Deva IV (1947–1956), titular
 Birakisore Deva III (1956–1970), titular
 Divyasingha Deva IV (1970–current, Current Raja of Puri and Titular Gajapati), titular

Kingdom of Ramnad (1601 – 1949 CE)

As Sethupathi chieftains of Madurai Nayaks (1601 – 1677) 
 Udaiyan Sethupathi (Sadaikkan) (1601–1623)
 Koottan Sethupathi (1623–1635)
 Dalavai Raghunatha Sethupathi (1635–1645)
 Thirumalai Raghunatha Sethupathi (1646–1676)
 Raja Suriya Sethupathi (1676)
 Aathana Raghunatha Sethupathi (1677)

Imperial Sethupathi rulers (1678 – 1795 CE) 
 Raghunatha Kilavan Sethupathi (1678–1710)
 Muthu Vairavanatha Sethupathi I (1710–1712)
 Vijaya Raghunatha Sethupathi (1713-1725)
 Sundaresvara Raghunatha Sethupathi (1725)
 Bavani Sangara Sethupathi (1725–1727)
 Kumara Muthu Vijaya Raghunatha Sethupathi (1728–1735)
 Sivakumara Muthu Vijaya Raghunatha Sethupathi (1735–1747)
 Rakka Thevar Sethupathi (1748)
 Sella Muthu Vijaya Raghunatha Sethupathi (1749–1762)
 Muthuramalinga Vijaya Ragunatha Sethupathi I (1762–1772 or 1781–1795)

Rulers of princely state under British Raj (1795 – 1949 CE)

As king 
 Mangaleswari Nachiyar (1795–1803)

As Zamindars 
 Mangaleswari Nachiyar (1803–1807)
 Annaswami Sethupathi (1807–1820)
 Ramaswami Sethupathi (1820–1830)
 Muthu Chella Thevar Sethupathi (1830–1846)
 Parvatha Vardhani Ammal Nachchiyar (1846–1862)
 Muthuramalinga Sethupathi II (1862–1873)
 Court of Wards (1873–1889)
 Bhaskara Sethupathy (1889–1903)
 Dinakara Sethupathy 
 Raja Rajeswara Sethupathi (1903–1929)
 Shanmugha Rajeswara Sethupathi (1929–1949), last ruler of kingdom

Chogyal Kingdom of Sikkim (1642 – 1975 CE) 

Rulers-
 Phuntsog Namgyal (1642–1670), Ascended the throne and was consecrated as the first Chogyal of Sikkim. Made the capital in Yuksom.
 Tensung Namgyal (1670–1700), Shifted capital to Rabdentse from Yuksom.
 Chakdor Namgyal (1700–1717), His half-sister Pendiongmu tried to dethrone Chakdor, who fled to Lhasa, but was reinstated as king with the help of Tibetans.
 Gyurmed Namgyal (1717–1733), During his regin Sikkim was attacked by Nepalis.
 Phuntsog Namgyal II (1733–1780), Nepalis raided Rabdentse, the then capital of Sikkim.
 Tenzing Namgyal (1780–1793), Chogyal fled to Tibet, and later died there in exile.
 Tsugphud Namgyal (1793–1863), The longest-reigning Chogyal of Sikkim. Shifted the capital from Rabdentse to Tumlong. Treaty of Titalia in 1817 between Sikkim and British India was signed in which territories lost to Nepal were appropriated to Sikkim. Darjeeling was gifted to British India in 1835. Two Britons, Archibald Campbell and Joseph Dalton Hooker were captured by the Sikkimese in 1849. Hostilities between British India and Sikkim continued and led to a treaty signed, in which Darjeeling was ceded to the British Raj.
 Sidkeong Namgyal (1863–1874)
 Thutob Namgyal (1874–1914), John Claude White appointed as the first political officer in Sikkim in 1889. Capital shifted from Tumlong to Gangtok in 1894.
 Sidkeong Tulku Namgyal (1914), The shortest-reigning Chogyal of Sikkim, ruled from 10 February to 5 December 1914. Died of heart failure, aged 35, in most suspicious circumstances.
 Tashi Namgyal (1914–1963), Treaty between India and Sikkim was signed in 1950, giving India suzerainty over Sikkim.
 Palden Thondup Namgyal (1963–1975), The last Chogyal of Sikkim, officially merged Sikkim into Indian Union.

Maratha Empire (1674 – 1947 CE)

House of Bhonsle

The Peshwas (1713 – 1858 CE)

Technically they were not monarchs, but hereditary prime ministers, though in fact they ruled instead of the Chhatrapati (Maratha emperor) after death of Chattrapati Shahu, and were hegemon of the Maratha confederation.

 Balaji Vishwanath (1713–2 April 1720) (b. 1660, died 2 April 1720)
 Peshwa Bajirao I (17 April 1720 – 28 April 1740) (b. 18 August 1700, died 28 April 1740)
 Balaji Bajirao (4 July 1740 – 23 June 1761) (b. 8 December 1721, d. 23 June 1761)
 Madhavrao Ballal (1761–18 November 1772) (b. 16 February 1745, d. 18 November 1772)
 Narayanrao Bajirao (13 Dec 1772 – 30 August 1773) (b. 10 August 1755, d. 30 August 1773)
 Raghunath Rao Bajirao (5 Dec 1773–1774) (b. 18 August 1734, d. 11 December 1783)
 Sawai Madhavrao (1774–27 October 1795) (b. 18 April 1774, d. 27 October 1795)
 Baji Rao II (6 Dec 1796 – 3 June 1818) (d. 28 January 1851)
 Nana Sahib (1 July 1857 – 1858) (b. 19 May 1825, d. 24 September 1859)

Gaekwad dynasty of Baroda (1721 – 1947 CE)

 Pilaji Rao Gaekwad (1721–1732)
 Damaji Rao Gaekwad (1732–1768)
 Govind Rao Gaekwad (1768–1771)
 Sayaji Rao Gaekwad I (1771–1789)
 Manaji Rao Gaekwad (1789–1793)
 Govind Rao Gaekwad (restored) (1793–1800)
 Anand Rao Gaekwad (1800–1818)
 Sayaji Rao Gaekwad II (1818–1847)
 Ganpat Rao Gaekwad (1847–1856)
 Khande Rao Gaekwad (1856–1870)
 Malhar Rao Gaekwad (1870–1875)
 Maharaja Sayajirao Gaekwad III (1875–1939)
 Pratap Singh Gaekwad (1939–1951)

Scindia of Gwalior (1731 – 1947 CE)

Ranojirao Scindia (1731–19 July 1745)
Jayapparao Scindia (1745–25 July 1755)
Jankojirao I Scindia (25 July 1755 – 15 January 1761). Born 1745
 Meharban Dattaji Rao Scindia, Regent (1755–10 January 1760). Died 1760
 Vacant 15 January 1761 – 25 November 1763
Kedarjirao Scindia (25 November 1763 – 10 July 1764)
Manajirao Scindia Phakade (10 July 1764 – 18 January 1768)
Mahadaji Scindia (18 January 1768 – 12 February 1794). Born c. 1730, died 1794
Daulatrao Scindia (12 February 1794 – 21 March 1827). Born 1779, died 1827
Jankoji Rao Scindia II (18 June 1827 – 7 February 1843). Born 1805, died 1843
Jayajirao Scindia (7 February 1843 – 20 June 1886). Born 1835, died 1886
Madho Rao Scindia (20 June 1886 – 5 June 1925). Born 1876, died 1925
George Jivajirao Scindia (Maharaja 5 June 1925 – 15 August 1947, Rajpramukh 28 May 1948 – 31 October 1956, later Rajpramukh). Born 1916, died 1961

Following the independence of India in 1947, the state acceded unto the Dominion of India.

Madhavrao Scindia (6 February 1949; died 2001)
Jyotiraditya Madhavrao Scindia (born 1 January 1971)

Holkar rulers of Indore (1731 – 1948 CE)

 Malharrao Holkar (I) (r. 2 November 1731 – 19 May 1766)
 Malerao Khanderao Holkar (r. 23 August 1766 – 5 April 1767)
 Punyaslok Rajmata Ahilyadevi Holkar (r. 5 April 1767 – 13 August 1795)
 Tukojirao Holkar (I) (r. 13 August 1795 – 29 January 1797)
 Kashirao Tukojirao Holkar (r. 29 January 1797 – 1798)
 Yashwantrao Holkar (I) (r. 1798–27 November 1811)
 Malharrao Yashwantrao Holkar II (r. November 1811–27 October 1833)
 Martandrao Malharrao Holkar (r. 17 January 1834 – 2 February 1834)
 Harirao Vitthojirao Holkar (r. 17 April 1834 – 24 October 1843)
 Khanderao Harirao Holkar II (r. 13 November 1843 – 17 March 1844)
 Tukojirao Gandharebhau Holkar II (r. 27 June 1844 – 17 June 1886)
 Shivajirao Tukojirao Holkar (r. 17 June 1886 – 31 January 1903)
 Tukojirao Shivajirao Holkar III (r. 31 January 1903 – 26 February 1926)
 Yashwantrao Holkar II (r. 26 February 1926 – 1961)

Following the independence of India in 1947, the state acceded unto the Dominion of India. The monarchy was ended in 1948, but the title is still held by Usha Devi Maharaj Sahiba Holkar XV Bahadur, Maharani of Indore since 1961.

Sinsinwar Jat Kingdom of Bharatpur (1683–1947 CE) 

List of rulers

Pudukkottai Kingdom (1686 – 1948 CE) 

Rulers-
 Raghunatha Raya Tondaiman (1686–1730), first ruler
 Vijaya Raghunatha Raya Tondaiman I (1730–1769)
 Raya Raghunatha Tondaiman (1769–1789)
 Vijaya Raghunatha Tondaiman (December 1789–February 1, 1807)
 Vijaya Raghunatha Raya Tondaiman II (February 1, 1807–June 1825)
 Raghunatha Tondaiman (June 1825–July 13, 1839)
 Ramachandra Tondaiman (July 13, 1839 – April 15, 1886)
 Martanda Bhairava Tondaiman (April 15, 1886 – May 28, 1928)
 Rajagopala Tondaiman (October 28, 1928 – August 15, 1947), last ruler

Sivaganga Kingdom (1725 – 1947 CE) 

Rulers–
 Muthu Vijaya Raghunatha Periyavudaya Thevar (1725–1750), founder of kingdom
 Muthu Vaduganatha Periyavudaya Thevar (1750–1780)
 Velu Nachiyar (1780–1790)
 Vellacci (1790–1793)
 Vangam Periya Udaya Thevar (1793–1801), last independent ruler

Zamindar under British rule (1803–1947)

Kingdom of Travancore (1729 – 1949 CE) 

Rulers–
 Marthanda Varma (1729–1758 CE), founder of kingdom
 Dharma Raja (1758–1798 CE)
 Balarama Varma (1798–1810CE)
 Gowri Lakshmi Bayi (1810–1815 CE)
 Gowri Parvati Bayi (1815–1829 CE)
 Swathi Thirunal (1829–1846 CE)
 Uthram Thirunal (1846–1860 CE)
 Ayilyam Thirunal (1860–1880 CE)
 Visakham Thirunal (1880–1885 CE)
 Moolam Thirunal (1885–1924 CE)
 Sethu Lakshmi Bayi (1924–1931 CE)
 Chithira Thirunal (1931–1949 CE), last ruler

Newalkar dynasty of Jhansi (1769 – 1858 CE) 

List of rulers–
 Raghunath Rao (1769–1796)
 Shiv Hari Rao (1796–1811)
 Ramchandra Rao (1811–1835)
 Raghunath Rao III (1835–1838)
 Sakku Bai Rao (1838–1839)
 Gangadhar Rao (1843–1853)
 Rani Lakshmi Bai as regent of Damodar Rao of Jhansi (21 November 1853 – 10 March 1854, 4 June 1857 – 4/5 April 1858)

Sikh Empire (1801–1849 CE)

 
List of rulers-
 Maharaja Ranjit Singh (b. 1780, crowned 12 April 1801; d. 1839 CE), founder of Sikh Empire
 Kharak Singh (b. 1801, d. 1840 CE), eldest son of Ranjit Singh
 Nau Nihal Singh (b. 1821, d. 1840 CE), grandson of Ranjit Singh
 Chand Kaur (b. 1802, d. 1842 CE) was briefly Regent
 Sher Singh (b. 1807, d. 1843 CE), son of Ranjit Singh
 Duleep Singh (b. 1838, crowned 1843, d. 1893 CE), youngest son of Ranjit Singh

The British Empire annexed the Punjab in 1845–49 CE; after the First and Second Anglo-Sikh Wars

Dogra dynasty of Jammu and Kashmir (1846–1952 CE)

Emperors/Empresses of India (1857–1947 CE)

See also
 Greater India
 History of India
 History of Hinduism
 History of Pakistan
 History of Sri Lanka
 History of South India
 List of Tamil monarchs
 List of rulers of Assam
 List of rulers of Malwa
 List of rulers of Bengal
 List of rulers of Odisha
 Middle kingdoms of India
 Timeline of Indian history
 List of wars involving India
 Outline of South Asian history
 List of Rajput dynasties and states
 List of Hindu empires and dynasties

Notes

References

Books

Sources and external links

Lists of monarchs

rulers